The full list of New Musical Express (NME) cover images and featured artists.

1955
1955-03-07 Vera Lynn, Alan Dean, Harry Gold, Ted Heath
1955-12-23 Jerry Colonna, Ronnie Aldrich, Harry Roy

1957
1957-05-24 Mantovani
1957-06-21 Vera Lynn
1957-08-30 Winifred Atwell

1958
1958-04-18 Elvis Presley, Tommy Steele, Marvin Rainwater & Sarah Vaughan, Pat Boone
1958-10-31 Seph Acre

1959
1959-01-30 Lonnie Donegan
1959-12-04 Lorie Mann

1960
1960-11-25 Alma Cogan
1960-07-29 Elvis Presley & Duane Eddy
1960-04-08 Everly Brothers
1960-04-22 Lyn Cornell
1960-12-02 Elvis Presley, Everly Brothers, Frank Sinatra, Bobby Darin
1960-11-04 Cliff Richard
1960-01-15 Elvis Presley, Gene Pitney, Fats Domino
1960-06-24 Cliff Richard
1960-08-19 Connie Francis
1960-12-23 Ruby Murray, Jimmy Lloyd (musician) and others

1961
1961-02-03 Adam Faith
1961-03-24 Marty Wilde
1961-04-07 Marty Robbins
1961-04-28 Adam Faith
1961-08-25 Gene Vincent
1961-09-27 Helen Shapiro
1961-10-27 Karl Denver
1961-11-24 Connie Francis

1962
1962-03-23 Brenda Lee
1962-04-06 Cliff Richard
1962-05-04 Elvis Presley, Cliff Richard
1962-05-18 Jet Harris
1962-05-25 Shirley Bassey
1962-06-01 Frank Sinatra
1962-06-15 Winnie
1962-06-29 Frank Ifield, Danny Williams
1962-07-06 Cliff Richard, Kenny Ball, Brenda Lee, Danny Storm
1962-07-13 Elvis Presley
1962-07-20 Lena Martell
1962-08-03 Bobby Vinton
1962-08-24 The Big Four (advert)
1962-08-31 Petula Clark, Joe Brown
1962-09-07 Shirley Bassey
1962-09-14 Eden Kane
1962-10-12 Frank Sinatra
1962-11-02 Peter Jay and the Jaywalkers
1962-11-09 Matt Monro
1962-11-23 Russ Conway
1962-12-07 Elvis Presley, Cliff Richard, Ray Bennett
1962-12-14 Cliff Richard

1963
1963-03-15 Bobby Rydell, Chubby Checker
1963-04-26 Elvis Presley
1963-07-05 Daryl Quist
1963-08-02 Tommy Quickly
1963-08-23 The Merseybeats
1963-08-30 Cliff Richard & The Shadows
1963-10-11 The Beatles
1963-12-27 Billy Fury

1964
1964-01-10 The Searchers, Ray Charles
1964-01-17 Gerry & The Pacemakers
1964-02-01 Tony D and The Shakeouts
1964-03-13 The Escorts, The Dave Clark Five, Mark Wynter
1964-06-19 Danny Williams
1964-07-10 The Merseybeats
1964-07-17 The Searchers
1964-07-31 Simon Scott
1964-10-02 Brian Epstein

1965
1965-05-21 The Beatles, The Walker Brothers
1965-05-28 Chad & Jeremy
1965-06-11 The Moody Blues
1965-07-09 P. J. Proby, The Animals
1965-08-20 Advert for various Warner Brothers/Reprise Records albums including Frank Sinatra's September Of My Years
1965-08-27 Unit 4 Plus 2
1965-09-17 Sonny and Cher, Sandie Shaw
1965-09-24 Star Scene 65 featuring Cilla Black and The Everly Brothers
1965-11-26 Advert for various albums including Kontroversy by The Kinks
1965-12-17 Wayne Fontana
1965-12-31 Final top 10 of 1965 with The Beatles, Fontella Bass, Ken Dodd etc.

1966
1966-02-11 Billy Fury
1966-02-18 Gary Walker
1966-05-13 The Rolling Stones
1966-05-27 Shirley Bassey
1966-06-17 Herman's Hermits
1966-07-15 Claude Francois
1966-08-05 Manfred Mann
1966-10-13 Herb Alpert
1966-10-28 Dave Clark Five
1966-11-04 Paul Anka
1966-11-11 The Shadows
1966-12-10 Dave Clark Five
1966-12-31 Petula Clark

1967
1967-01-07 The Monkees
1967-01-14 the Four Tops
1967-02-25 Davy Jones of The Monkees
1967-03-04 David Garrick
1967-03-25 The Monkees
1967-04-01 Herb Albert
1967-04-08 Wayne Thomas, Lulu
1967-04-22 The Herd
1967-05-20 Dusty Springfield
1967-06-24 Scott McKenzie flower power advert for "San Francisco" single
1967-07-08 John Walker
1967-07-15 The Troggs advert for "Hi Hi Hazel" single
1967-08-05 The Rolling Stones
1967-08-12 The Fortunes
1967-08-19 Jimi Hendrix Experience
1967-09-09 Scott Walker
1967-09-30 Dusty Springfield
1967-11-04 The Nice
1967-11-23 Traffic advert for "Here We Go Round The Mulberry Bush" single
1967-12-02 Scott Walker advert for "Jackie" single
1967-12-16 "The Four Musketeers!" cast recording advert
1967-12-23 Christmas edition with a letter of thanks to its readers

1968
1968-01-06 P.P. Arnold
1968-02-03 Status Quo, Marty Wilde
1968-02-10 The Nerve
1968-02-24 Dave Clark Five
1968-03-09 Barry Noble
1968-03-16 The Beatles
1968-04-06 Scott Walker
1968-04-30 Gene Pitney
1968-04-13 Johnny Cash
1968-04-27 The Small Faces
1968-05-04 Scott Walker
1968-06-01 The Beatles, The Monkees
1968-06-15 Esther & Abi Ofarim
1968-06-22 Seth Martin
1968-06-29 Anan
1968-07-27 The Beatles, Micky Dolenz gets married
1968-08-10 The Marbles
1968-08-24 Tom Jones
1968-09-07 The Weight
1968-09-14 Jackie Lomax
1968-10-26 Jimi Hendrix, The Hollies, The Who
1968-11-02 Jimi Hendrix advert for Electric Ladyland
1968-11-09 Advert for Atlantic Records albums
1968-11-30 Petula Clark

1969
1969-01-04 Cartoone
1969-01-11 Dusty Springfield, and Marmalade
1969-01-18 The Troggs
1969-01-25 Amen Corner's "(If Paradise Is) Half as Nice"
1969-02-01 The Doors' "Touch Me"
1969-02-08 Cilla Black
1969-02-15 Buddah Records' singles
1969-02-22 Dave Dee, Dozy, Beaky, Mick & Tich's "Don Juan"
1969-03-01 The Marbles
1969-03-08 The Small Faces
1969-03-15 John Rowles, Peter Gordeno, and Troy Dante
1969-03-22 Scott Walker
1969-03-29 Colosseum
1969-04-05 advert for Fleetwood Mac's "Man of the World"
1969-04-12 Atlantic Records competition
1969-04-19 Taste
1969-04-26 Humble Pie
1969-05-03 Sandie Shaw, and Heathmore
1969-05-10 Nana Mouskouri
1969-05-17 1969 NME Poll Winner's Concert
1969-05-24 Thunderclap Newman
1969-05-31 Mike d'Abo, and Tom Jones
1969-06-07 Mike Kennedy, and David McWilliams
1969-06-14 Amen Corner
1969-06-21 Scott Walker
1969-06-28 Robin Gibb
1969-07-05 The Plastic Ono Band's "Give Peace a Chance"
1969-07-12 Yes's "Sweetness"
1969-07-19 The Rolling Stones, relating to the death of Brian Jones, and advert for Herb Alpert's Warm
1969-07-26 Engelbert Humperdinck
1969-08-02 Humble Pie (advert for As Safe as Yesterday is)
1969-08-09 Humble Pie
1969-08-16 The Nice
1969-08-30 Amen Corner
1969-09-06 Fat Mattress
1969-09-13 Jonathan Kelly
1969-09-20 Dusty Springfield (advert for "Am I the Same Girl"), and Barry Ryan (advert for "The Hunt")
1969-09-27 advert for The Beatles' Abbey Road
1969-10-04 Changes '69 Tour headlining Humble Pie, Love Sculpture, and David Bowie
1969-10-11 The Family Dogg
1969-10-18 Amen Corner
1969-10-25 Humble Pie
1969-11-01 John Mayall
1969-11-08 Lulu
1969-11-15 Amen Corner
1969-11-22 Engelbert Humperdinck
1969-11-29 Robin Gibb
1969-12-06 Clodagh Rodgers
1969-12-13 Scott Walker
1969-12-20 Seasons greetings from RAK Records (Peter Grant and Mickie Most)
1969-12-27 Tom Jones, Mick Jagger, and Scott Walker

1970
1970-01-03 Love Affair, King Crimson, and Bonzo Dog Band
1970-01-10 Rolf Harris, and Glen Campbell
1970-01-17 Elvis Presley, Tom Jones, and Led Zeppelin
1970-01-24 Fleetwood Mac
1970-01-31 Barry Ryan
1970-02-07 Judith Durham
1970-02-14 Judas Jump
1970-02-21 Fleetwood Mac, Ringo Starr, Chicago, and Shocking Blue
1970-02-28 Viv Stanshall, Booker T. & the M.G.'s, Gene Pitney, and the Cuff Links
1970-03-07 The Beatles
1970-03-14 Russ Conway
1970-03-21 James Wilson, Jackie Trent, and Tony Hatch and the Cherry Children
1970-03-28 Buck Owens' Country Music Caravan tour
1970-04-04 Ringo Starr's Sentimental Journey
1970-04-11 Tom Jones
1970-04-18 Maurice Gibb
1970-04-25 Paul McCartney
1970-05-02 Simon & Garfunkel
1970-05-09 Bill Martin and Phil Coulter
1970-05-16 Traffic, Mick Jagger, Christie, The Who, and Frank Sinatra
1970-05-23 The Who
1970-05-30 Les Reed
1970-06-06 Barry Gibb
1970-06-13 Deep Purple
1970-06-20 Raymond Froggatt
1970-06-27 Led Zeppelin
1970-07-04 Dusty Springfield
1970-07-11 Jack Wild
1970-07-18 Emerson, Lake & Palmer
1970-07-25 Hyde Park Festival
1970-08-01 The Kinks, Mungo Jerry, Free, and Hotlegs
1970-08-08 Isle of Wight Festival
1970-08-15 The Moody Blues' A Question of Balance
1970-08-22 Elvis Presley, Tom Jones, and Free
1970-08-29 Bobby Bloom's "Montego Bay"
1970-09-05 Isle of Wight Festival review
1970-09-12 Humble Pie
1970-09-19 Eric Burdon & War, and the Rolling Stones
1970-10-03 Jethro Tull, Pentangle, and The Who
1970-10-10 T.Rex's "Ride A White Swan", and The Move's "When Alice Comes Back to the Farm"
1970-10-24 Advertisement for James Brown's "Get Up (I Feel Like Being A Sex Machine)"
1970-10-31 Tom Jones
1970-11-07 Matthews Southern Comfort
1970-11-14 Don Fardon, the Hollies, Roger Cook & Kenny Everett
1970-11-28 Elvis Presley, and Jimi Hendrix
1970-12-05 George Harrison, Bob Dylan, and Brian Wilson
1970-12-12 Dave Edmunds, McGuinness Flint, and Neil Diamond
1970-12-19 Seasonal greetings (Christmas issue)
1970-12-26 The Who, and Canned Heat

1971
1971-01-02 Frankie Valli and the Four Seasons
1971-01-09 Paul McCartney
1971-01-16 Dave Edmunds, Andy Williams, and Clive Dunn
1971-01-23 Jethro Tull, and The Mixtures
1971-01-30 Cliff Richard
1971-02-06 George Harrison, and Eric Burdon
1971-02-13 Elvis Presley
1971-02-20 Paul McCartney & Linda McCartney
1971-02-27 Mick Jagger, and Mungo Jerry
1971-03-06 Elton John, and Atomic Rooster
1971-03-13 Mick Jagger
1971-03-20 Tom Jones
1971-03-27 Marc Bolan
1971-04-03 John Lennon
1971-04-10 Elton John, and Elvis Presley
1971-04-17 Neil Diamond
1971-04-24 Ringo Starr
1971-05-01 The Beatles
1971-05-08 Carlos Santana, and Paul McCartney
1971-05-15 Eric Clapton, and Jimi Hendrix
1971-05-22 Keith Emerson, and Mick Jagger
1971-05-29 Ringo Starr
1971-06-05 The Rolling Stones
1971-06-12 Free
1971-06-19 Steve Winwood
1971-06-26 Keith Richard of The Rolling Stones
1971-07-03 James Taylor
1971-07-10 Creedence Clearwater Revival
1971-07-17 Sweet
1971-07-24 The Who
1971-07-31 John Lennon & Yoko Ono
1971-08-07 Marc Bolan
1971-08-14 Jethro Tull, and Marmalade
1971-08-21 Diana Ross
1971-08-28 Mick Jagger
1971-09-04 Faces
1971-09-11 John Fogerty of Creedence Clearwater Revival
1971-09-18 Ten Years After
1971-09-25 Led Zeppelin
1971-10-02 Neil Diamond
1971-10-09 Rod Stewart
1971-10-16 The Who
1971-10-23 Crosby & Nash
1971-10-30 Redbone, and The Hollies
1971-11-06 Elton John
1971-11-13 Slade
1971-11-20 The Supremes, and Paul McCartney & Linda McCartney
1971-11-27 The Rolling Stones
1971-12-04 Isaac Hayes, and Emerson, Lake & Palmer
1971-12-11 George Harrison
1971-12-18 Free
1971-12-25 Alvin Lee of Ten Years After

1972
1972-01-01 T.Rex
1972-01-08 Family, Curved Air, Fleetwood Mac
1972-01-15 Cat Stevens
1972-01-22 T.Rex
1972-01-29 The Rolling Stones
1972-02-05 Marc Bolan (the first issue of the NME's transformation into a more contemporary rock weekly)
1972-02-12 Chuck Berry
1972-02-19 Joe Cocker
1972-02-26 Humble Pie, and Viv Stanshall
1972-03-04 Neil Young
1972-03-11 Marc Bolan
1972-03-18 Steve Marriott of Humble Pie
1972-03-25 T.Rex
1972-04-01 Stephen Stills, and Manassas
1972-04-08 Joe Cocker
1972-04-15 The Beach Boys
1972-04-22 The Rolling Stones
1972-04-29 T.Rex
1972-05-06 T.Rex
1972-05-13 Rod Stewart of The Faces
1972-05-20 Mick Jagger, and Wishbone Ash
1972-05-27 Janis Joplin, and The Beach Boys
1972-06-03 Joe Cocker
1972-06-10 Maggie Bell
1972-06-17 The Rolling Stones
1972-06-24 T.Rex
1972-07-01 Jethro Tull
1972-07-08 Paul McCartney–Wings
1972-07-15 David Bowie
1972-07-22 Hawkwind
1972-07-29 Ten Years After
1972-08-05 Rod Stewart
1972-08-12 Stephen Stills
1972-08-19 Alice Cooper
1972-08-26 Marc Bolan
1972-09-02 Slade
1972-09-09 Not published due to strike action.
1972-09-16 Elvis Presley, and Mott the Hoople
1972-09-23 Free
1972-09-30 John Lennon
1972-10-07 Ten Years After
1972-10-14 Hawkwind, and Alice Cooper
1972-10-21 Curved Air
1972-10-28 David Cassidy
1972-11-04 T.Rex
1972-11-11 Led Zeppelin
1972-11-18 Faces
1972-11-25 Family
1972-12-02 Chuck Berry
1972-12-09 Slade
1972-12-16 The Who
1972-12-23 The Rolling Stones
1972-12-30 Jimi Hendrix

1973
1973-01-06 Steeleye Span
1973-01-13 Neil Young
1973-01-20 Eric Clapton
1973-01-27 Maggie Bell
1973-02-03 Alice Cooper
1973-02-10 Joan Baez, and Alice Cooper
1973-02-17 T.Rex
1973-02-24 Slade
1973-03-03 Paul Simon, and Neil Young and Crazy Horse
1973-03-10 Faces
1973-03-17 David Bowie
1973-03-24 Neil Young
1973-03-31 Lindisfarne
1973-04-07 Faces
1973-04-14 David Bowie
1973-04-21 Led Zeppelin
1973-04-28 Slade, The Rolling Stones, and Joan Baez
1973-05-05 Paul Simon
1973-05-12 Maggie Bell
1973-05-19 David Bowie
1973-05-26 Faces
1973-06-02 Frank Zappa, and Jimmy McCulloch
1973-06-09 Edgar Winter
1973-06-16 Wings
1973-06-23 Van Morrison
1973-06-30 Carole King
1973-07-07 David Bowie
1973-07-14 David Bowie
1973-07-21 The Rolling Stones
1973-07-28 Roxy Music
1973-08-04 Faces
1973-08-11 Lou Reed
1973-08-18 Faces
1973-08-25 Jethro Tull
1973-09-01 Roxy Music
1973-09-08 Ten Years After
1973-09-15 George Harrison
1973-09-22 The Rolling Stones
1973-09-29 The Osmonds
1973-10-06 Faces
1973-10-13 Emerson, Lake & Palmer
1973-10-20 James Dean, and Family
1973-10-27 David Bowie, and Mick Jagger
1973-11-03 Pink Floyd
1973-11-10 Greg Lake of Emerson, Lake & Palmer
 All issues suspended for a period of nine weeks due to a printers' strike

1974
1974-01-19 Bryan Ferry
1974-01-26 Rick Wakeman
1974-02-02 Brian Eno
1974-02-09 Mott the Hoople
1974-02-16 Art Garfunkel
1974-02-23 David Bowie
1974-03-02 Roy Wood
1974-03-09 Lou Reed
1974-03-16 Gene Simmons of Kiss
1974-03-23 Gary Glitter
1974-03-30 Elton John
1974-04-06 Joni Mitchell
1974-04-13 Syd Barrett
1974-04-20 Eric Clapton
1974-04-27 The Who
1974-05-04 Rod Stewart
1974-05-11 David Bowie
1974-05-18 Sparks
1974-05-25 Monty Python
1974-06-01 Van Morrison
1974-06-08 Rick Wakeman
1974-06-15 Keith Richards
1974-06-22 Robin Nash (then producer of Top of the Pops)
1974-06-29 Eric Clapton
1974-07-06 Elton John
1974-07-13 Roxy Music
1974-07-20 "Was school ever like this? NME reports the schoolkids' Tommy"
1974-07-27 John McLaughlin
1974-08-03 Rod Stewart
1974-08-10 The Rolling Stones
1974-08-17 Roxy Music
1974-08-24 Mike Oldfield, and Robert Wyatt
1974-08-31 Kevin Ayers
1974-09-07 Black Oak Arkansas
1974-09-14 Mike Oldfield
1974-09-21 The Who
1974-09-28 Mott the Hoople
1974-10-05 Frank Zappa
1974-10-12 Led Zeppelin
1974-10-19 Alex Harvey
1974-10-26 Faces
1974-11-02 Virgin label tour bus
1974-11-09 Rory Gallagher
1974-11-16 David Bowie
1974-11-23 Hawkwind
1974-11-30 Yes, Faces, and The Beatles
1974-12-07 Bad Company
1974-12-14 "Boppers Rool! But do they?" (Investigative feature on the marketing of teen pop)
1974-12-21 Bryan Ferry
1974-12-28 The Mahavishnu Orchestra, Santana, and Bachman-Turner Overdrive

1975
1975-01-04 The Rolling Stones
1975-01-11 Pink Floyd
1975-01-18 Lee Brilleaux, Average White Band, and Gregg Allman
1975-01-25 Suzi Quatro
1975-02-01 Little Feat
1975-02-08 Robert Plant and Paul Rodgers
1975-02-15 Paul Kossoff
1975-02-22 Elton John
1975-03-01 Ian Anderson
1975-03-08 John Lennon
1975-03-15 David Bowie and Art Garfunkel
1975-03-22 Bad Company
1975-03-29 The Who
1975-04-05 Rick Wakeman
1975-04-12 Ringo Starr
1975-04-19 Japanese rock
1975-04-26 Frank Zappa
1975-05-03 Man
1975-05-10 Bay City Rollers
1975-05-17 Maria Muldaur
1975-05-24 Jimmy Page of Led Zeppelin
1975-05-31 Wings
1975-06-07 Billy Connolly
1975-06-14 Dr. Feelgood
1975-06-21 Brian Wilson
1975-06-28 Neil Young
1975-07-05 10cc
1975-07-12 Eric Clapton
1975-07-19 Bob Marley
1975-07-26 Paul McCartney
1975-08-02 Rod Stewart
1975-08-09 The Who
1975-08-16 Steve Marriott
1975-08-23 David Bowie
1975-08-30 Roxy Music
1975-09-06 Alice Cooper
1975-09-13 Genesis
1975-09-20 Alex Harvey
1975-09-27 Jim Morrison
1975-10-04 Johnny Cash
1975-10-11 Bruce Springsteen
1975-10-18 The Who
1975-10-25 Ozzy Osbourne of Black Sabbath
1975-11-01 Tina Turner
1975-11-08 Remember Those Fabulous 60s: The Beat Boom Revisited
1975-11-15 Bob Dylan and Bruce Springsteen
1975-11-22 The Rolling Stones
1975-11-29 Freddie Mercury
1975-12-06 Lowell George
1975-12-13 Rockpile 75: Bob Dylan, Lowell George, and David Bowie
1975-12-20 Steeleye Span
1975-12-27 Peter Gabriel

1976
1976-01-03 Is rock 'n' roll ready for 1976?
1976-01-10 The Great British Music Festival audience at Olympia
1976-01-17 Bad Company
1976-01-24 Is rock 'n' roll an old man's game?
1976-01-31 The Small Faces
1976-02-07 10cc
1976-02-14 Robert Plant of Led Zeppelin
1976-02-21 Patti Smith
1976-02-28 Top 100 NME singles of all time
1976-03-06 David Bowie ("Bowie's Back" issue)
1976-03-13 Not published due to strike action.
1976-03-20 Phil Spector
1976-03-27 Bobby Womack
1976-04-03 Neil Young
1976-04-10 Rock 'n' roll/Teddy Boy revival
1976-04-17 Sweet
1976-04-24 Charlie Watts
1976-05-01 Buffy Sainte-Marie
1976-05-08 How to bluff your way thru rock n roll
1976-05-15 David Bowie
1976-05-22 Nils Lofgren
1976-05-29 The Rolling Stones
1976-06-05 Roger Daltrey
1976-06-12 Helen Mirren
1976-06-19 Bob Marley
1976-06-26 Bryan Ferry
1976-07-03 Eric Clapton
1976-07-10 Zen and the art of cool maintenance
1976-07-17 The Who
1976-07-24 The Runaways
1976-07-31 Fleetwood Mac
1976-08-07 Eric Clapton
1976-08-14 Ted Nugent
1976-08-21 Blue Öyster Cult
1976-08-28 Not published due to strike action.
1976-09-04 Not published due to strike action.
1976-09-11 Queen
1976-09-18 Eddie and the Hot Rods
1976-09-25 Bob Dylan
1976-10-02 Dr. Feelgood/Sex Pistols
1976-10-09 Marvin Gaye
1976-10-16 Bunny Wailer
1976-10-23 Patti Smith
1976-10-30 Rod Stewart
1976-11-06 Independent record labels
1976-11-13 Graham Parker
1976-11-20 Jimmy Page of Led Zeppelin
1976-11-27 Brian Eno
1976-12-04 The Kursaal Flyers
1976-12-11 Sex Pistols and the fallout from the Bill Grundy interview on Thames Television's Today show
1976-12-18 Jackson Browne
1976-12-25 The Best albums of the year ... 1966

1977
1977-01-01 Genesis
1977-01-08 Joe Cocker
1977-01-15 Ry Cooder
1977-01-22 The Rolling Stones
1977-01-29 Joan Armatrading
1977-02-05 Television
1977-02-12 Pink Floyd's Animals
1977-02-19 Eddie and the Hot Rods and 1977 Reader's Honours List
1977-02-26 Led Zeppelin
1977-03-05 Iggy Pop
1977-03-12 Iggy Pop and David Bowie
1977-03-19 The Damned
1977-03-26 Bruce Springsteen
1977-04-02 The Clash
1977-04-09 Thin Lizzy
1977-04-16 The Kinks
1977-04-23 Bob Marley
1977-04-30 Muddy Waters
1977-05-07 The Jam
1977-05-14 Ian Hunter
1977-05-21 Ramones
1977-05-28 Sex Pistols
1977-06-04 Gene Simmons, and Dolly Parton
1977-06-11 Britain's Nuclear power stations
1977-06-18 The Stranglers
1977-06-25 Van Morrison
1977-07-02 Murder at a punk festival (Belfield Festival, Dublin)
1977-07-09 Anti-Punk violence
1977-07-16 Frankie Miller
1977-07-23 Steve Harley
1977-07-30 Nick Lowe
1977-08-06 Sex Pistols
1977-08-13 Willy DeVille of Mink DeVille
1977-08-20 Wayne Kramer of the MC5
1977-08-27 Elvis Presley (following his death)
1977-09-03 Record collecting
1977-09-10 Thin Lizzy
1977-09-17 Iggy Pop
1977-09-24 The Adverts
1977-10-01 Rob Tyner of the MC5
1977-10-08 Jean-Jacques Burnel of The Stranglers
1977-10-15 Ian Dury
1977-10-22 Tom Robinson
1977-10-29 The Tubes
1977-11-05 The Who
1977-11-12 David Bowie
1977-11-19 Wilko Johnson
1977-11-26 Brian Eno
1977-12-03 Buzzcocks
1977-12-10 The Clash
1977-12-17 Wire
1977-12-24 Ian Dury and Dave Vanian

1978
1978-01-07 Ramones
1978-01-14 John Lennon
1978-01-21 Power pop
1978-01-28 Bob Geldof of The Boomtown Rats
1978-02-04 Blondie
1978-02-11 Tom Robinson Band
1978-02-18 Bob Marley
1978-02-25 Howard Devoto
1978-03-04 Bryan Ferry
1978-03-11 Sham 69
1978-03-18 Nick Lowe
1978-03-25 Elvis Costello
1978-04-01 The Jam
1978-04-08 Generation X
1978-04-15 Ian Dury
1978-04-22 Bob Dylan
1978-04-29 Kraftwerk
1978-05-06 Anti-Nazi League demonstration in London
1978-05-13 X-Ray Spex
1978-05-20 Jonathan Richman
1978-05-27 Public Image Ltd
1978-06-03 Wilko Johnson
1978-06-10 Peter Gabriel
1978-06-17 Pete Shelley of Buzzcocks
1978-06-24 Bob Dylan
1978-07-01 Stonehenge
1978-07-08 Devo
1978-07-15 Mick Jones of The Clash
1978-07-22 Record and Tape Piracy
1978-07-29 Culture (band)
1978-08-05 Keith Richards of The Rolling Stones
1978-08-12 The Who
1978-08-19 Paul Cook & Steve Jones of Sex Pistols
1978-08-26 Siouxsie and the Banshees
1978-09-02 David Bowie
1978-09-09 Hugh Cornwell of The Stranglers
1978-09-16 Patti Smith
1978-09-23 Dave Edmunds
1978-09-30 The Pop Group
1978-10-07 The Slits
1978-10-14 Bruce Springsteen
1978-10-21 Andy Partridge of XTC
1978-10-28 Elton John
1978-11-04 The Jam
1978-11-11 Pauline Murray of Penetration
1978-11-18 Pere Ubu
1978-11-25 Roxy Music
1978-12-02 The Clash (the first issue of NME to feature the original version of the current logo, designed by Barney Bubbles)
1978-12-09 Giorgio Moroder
1978-12-16 Bob Geldof of The Boomtown Rats
1978-12-23 John Lydon

1979
1979-01-06 French rock music
1979-01-13 Ian Curtis of Joy Division/Bob Last of Fast Product/Here & Now ("Nationwide Ethnic Credibility Special '79")
1979-01-20 Gang of Four
1979-01-27 Elvis Costello
1979-02-03 Kevin Coyne
1979-02-10 Jean-Jacques Burnel (of The Stranglers)
1979-02-17 Village People
1979-02-24 Dennis Brown
1979-03-03 Graham Parker
1979-03-10 Van Morrison
1979-03-17 The Only Ones
1979-03-24 Iggy Pop
1979-03-31 The Human League
1979-04-07 Nicky Tesco of The Members
1979-04-14 The Mod revival
1979-04-21 Linton Kwesi Johnson
1979-04-28 Pete Shelley of Buzzcocks
1979-05-05 Ted Nugent
1979-05-12 Cyrille Regis – article on British football
1979-05-19 Bryan Ferry (then of Roxy Music)
1979-05-26 The New Barbarians
1979-06-02 Ian Dury
1979-06-09 Dire Straits
1979-06-16 Public Image Ltd
1979-06-23 The Cramps
1979-06-30 Steel Pulse
1979-07-07 John Cooper Clarke
1979-07-14 Devo
1979-07-21 Squeeze
1979-07-28 Talking Heads
1979-08-04 Jimmy Page of Led Zeppelin
1979-08-11 Joy Division
1979-08-18 John Peel
1979-08-25 The Specials
1979-09-01 The Police
1979-09-08 The Slits
1979-09-15 Feargal Sharkey of The Undertones
1979-09-22 Stiff Little Fingers
1979-09-29 Debbie Harry of Blondie
1979-10-06 Ray Davies of The Kinks
1979-10-13 The Clash
1979-10-20 Bob Geldof of The Boomtown Rats
1979-10-27 Jimmy Pursey of Sham 69
1979-11-03 Paul Weller
1979-11-10 Bob Marley
1979-11-17 Secret Affair
1979-11-24 John Lydon
1979-12-01 Richard Jobson
1979-12-08 Nick Lowe (although this issue was officially dated to Friday 7 December, not Saturday 8th)
1979-12-15 Marlon Brando
1979-12-22 Review of the year

1980
1980-01-05 Preview of 1980 (though the date on the cover actually states 1979-01-05)
1980-01-12 Pink Military
1980-01-19 The Jam
1980-01-26 The Pretenders
1980-02-02 Iggy Pop
1980-02-09 The Specials
1980-02-16 Rockabilly
1980-02-23 The Selecter
1980-03-01 Joe Ely
1980-03-08 The Beat
1980-03-15 Tom Petty
1980-03-22 Paul Weller of The Jam
1980-03-29 Women in Rock
1980-04-05 The Teardrop Explodes
1980-04-12 The Police
1980-04-19 Pete Townshend of The Who
1980-04-26 Feargal Sharkey of The Undertones
no NME issues for six weeks due to an NUJ strike
1980-06-14 Joy Division
1980-06-21 Gang of Four
1980-06-28 Mick Jagger of The Rolling Stones
1980-07-05 Keith Levene of Public Image Ltd.
1980-07-12 The Human League
1980-07-19 Ian Dury and Wilko Johnson
1980-07-26 Impressions of Japan (the country, not the band), with lead story on the Yellow Magic Orchestra
1980-08-02 The Selecter
1980-08-09 Malcolm McLaren
1980-08-16 The Beat
1980-08-23 NME Consumers Guide 1984
1980-08-30 Stray Cats
1980-09-06 A Certain Ratio
1980-09-13 David Bowie
1980-09-20 XTC
1980-09-27 The Specials
1980-10-04 Madness
1980-10-11 Au Pairs
1980-10-18 The Pretenders
1980-10-25 Toyah Willcox
1980-11-01 Captain Beefheart
1980-11-08 Talking Heads
1980-11-15 Brit funk
1980-11-22 Echo & the Bunnymen
1980-11-29 Cabaret Voltaire
1980-12-06 UB40
1980-12-13 John Lennon (following his death)
1980-12-20 The Slits

1981
1981-01-03 Joe Strummer (then of The Clash)
1981-01-10 Trans Europe Express cover (music in Eastern Europe)
1981-01-17 Wah! Heat
1981-01-24 NME 1980 Poll Winners
1981-01-31 C81 tape offer
1981-02-07 The Police
1981-02-14 Bono of U2
1981-02-21 Roots reggae
1981-02-28 Marvin Gaye
1981-03-07 Richard Jobson
1981-03-14 John Lydon
1981-03-21 Jap Payback – issue on Japanese music
1981-03-28 Madness
1981-04-04 Michael Jackson
1981-04-11 Popeye
1981-04-18 The Scars
1981-04-25 The Polecats
1981-05-02 Girlschool
1981-05-09 Clare Grogan of Altered Images and Edwyn Collins of Orange Juice
1981-05-16 Bob Marley memorial issue
1981-05-23 The Beat
1981-05-30 The Treacherous Three (Rap issue)
1981-06-06 Prince
1981-06-13 Julian Cope of The Teardrop Explodes
1981-06-20 James Chance
1981-06-27 Defunkt
1981-07-04 Kid Creole
1981-07-11 Southall riots
1981-07-18 ABC
1981-07-25 Grace Jones
1981-08-01 Spandau Ballet
1981-08-08 The Specials
1981-08-15 Bob Dylan
1981-08-22 Depeche Mode
1981-08-29 Blue Rondo a la Turk
1981-09-05 Madness
1981-09-12 Soft Cell
1981-09-19 Kim Wilde
1981-09-26 Sting
1981-10-03 Annabella Lwin of Bow Wow Wow
1981-10-10 The Clash
1981-10-17 Jello Biafra of The Dead Kennedys
1981-10-24 British youth
1981-10-31 Scritti Politti
1981-11-07 Rik Mayall
1981-11-14 Mark E. Smith of The Fall
1981-11-21 Maurice White of Earth, Wind & Fire
1981-11-28 Deutsch Amerikanische Freundschaft
1981-12-05 Elvis Presley
1981-12-12 Coronation Street
1981-12-19 Review of 1981

1982
1982-01-02 David Sylvian (then of Japan)
1982-01-09 Vic Godard
1982-01-16 Adam Ant
1982-01-23 James Brown
1982-01-30 NME Readers Poll
1982-02-06 Kirk Brandon (then of Theatre of Hate)
1982-02-13 Fun Boy Three
1982-02-20 Ian McCulloch of Echo & the Bunnymen
1982-02-27 U2
1982-03-06 ABC
1982-03-13 Haircut One Hundred
1982-03-20 Peter Murphy of Bauhaus
1982-03-27 British Electric Foundation
1982-04-03 Norman Giscombe
1982-04-10 The Beat
1982-04-17 Siouxsie and the Banshees
1982-04-24 The Associates
1982-05-01 Boy George (then of Culture Club)
1982-05-08 Eddie the Head of Iron Maiden
1982-05-15 Kid Creole and the Coconuts
1982-05-22 The Honeymoon Killers
1982-05-29 Joe Strummer
1982-06-05 The Human League
1982-06-12 Rip Rig + Panic
1982-06-19 Bryan Ferry
1982-06-26 Laurie Anderson
1982-07-03 Kevin Rowland of Dexys Midnight Runners
1982-07-10 Bananarama
1982-07-17 Talking Heads
1982-07-24 Vince Clarke of Yazoo
1982-07-31 Torch songs (themed issue)
1982-08-07 John Lydon
1982-08-14 Alfred Hitchcock
1982-08-21 Grandmaster Flash
1982-08-28 King Sunny Adé
1982-09-04 Scritti Politti
1982-09-11 Africa (themed issue)
1982-09-18 Gary Kendall bodybuilder
1982-09-25 Bow Wow Wow
1982-10-02 Southern Death Cult
1982-10-09 Musical Youth
1982-10-16 The Damned
1982-10-23 Ziggy Stardust
1982-10-30 Elvis Costello
1982-11-06 David Sylvian
1982-11-13 NME TV Special
1982-11-20 Eddy Grant
1982-11-27 Wham!
1982-12-04 Simple Minds
1982-12-11 Marvin Gaye
1982-12-18 Set The Tone
1982-12-25 Paul Weller

1983
1983-01-08 The Specials
1983-01-15 The Fall
1983-01-22 Imagination
1983-01-29 JoBoxers
1983-02-05 Einstuerzende Neubaten
1983-02-12 Richard Hell
1983-02-19 Blood and Roses and Brigandage
1983-02-26 U2
1983-03-05 Fun Boy Three
1983-03-12 Stray Cats
1983-03-19 Echo & the Bunnymen
1983-03-26 Nick Cave
1983-04-02 Madness
1983-04-09 Tracie Young
1983-04-16 David Bowie
1983-04-23 Orange Juice
1983-04-30 Boy George (then of Culture Club)
1983-05-07 Jeffrey Lee Pierce of Gun Club
1983-05-14 Siouxsie Sioux
1983-05-21 Pete Murphy of Bauhaus
1983-05-28 Alison Moyet (then of Yazoo)
1983-06-04 Death Cult
1983-06-11 Roddy Frame of Aztec Camera
1983-06-18 Wham!
1983-06-25 Grace Jones
1983-07-02 Eddie and Sunshine
1983-07-09 Curtis Mayfield
1983-07-16 Cabaret Voltaire
1983-07-23 New Order
1983-07-30 Mary Jane Girls
1983-08-06 Video game arcades
1983-08-13 Test Dept
1983-08-20 Ryuichi Sakamoto
1983-08-27 General Public
1983-09-03 Frank Bruno with the JoBoxers
1983-09-10 Virginia Astley
1983-09-17 Depeche Mode
1983-09-24 Big Country
1983-10-01 Tom Waits
1983-10-08 Elvis Costello
1983-10-15 Delinquents! The outsiders guide to life inside
1983-10-22 SPK
1983-10-29 The Assembly (Feargal Sharkey and Vince Clarke)
1983-11-05 Frankie Goes to Hollywood
1983-11-12 The Immaculate Consumptive
1983-11-19 Debbie Harry
1983-11-26 Chrissie Hynde of The Pretenders
1983-12-03 The Police
1983-12-10 Cocteau Twins
1983-12-17 Animal liberation movement
1983-12-24 Christmas issue

1984

1984-01-07 Roddy Frame of Aztec Camera
1984-01-14 Billy Bragg
1984-01-21 Madness
1984-01-28 Aswad
1984-02-04 The Smiths
1984-02-11 Yoko Ono
1984-02-18 NMEdia issue
1984-02-25 The Clash
1984-03-03 Mad axemen and guitar heroes (Heavy Metal issue)
1984-03-10 Paul Weller
1984-03-17 Foetus
1984-03-24 Jon Moss of Culture Club
1984-03-31 Hugh Masekela
1984-04-07 Marvin Gaye (following his death)
1984-04-14 Soul issue
1984-04-21 The Three Johns
1984-04-28 Bananarama
1984-05-05 Nena
1984-05-12 Nick Cave
1984-05-19 Bronski Beat
1984-05-26 Pete Burns of Dead or Alive

NME was not published in June and July this year due to a NUJ strike.

1984-08-04 Rik Mayall
1984-08-11 Mike Scott of The Waterboys
1984-08-18 Heaven 17
1984-08-25 Sade
1984-09-01 Afrika Bambaataa and James Brown
1984-09-08 War on Pop issue (a polemical piece by Ian Penman)
1984-09-15 Henry Rollins
1984-09-22 Boy George
1984-09-29 David Bowie
1984-10-06 Robert De Niro
1984-10-13 ZTT & The Art of Noise
1984-10-20 Paul Weller
1984-10-27 U2
1984-11-03 The Redskins
1984-11-10 Annie Lennox
1984-11-17 ZZ Top
1984-11-24 Charlie Nicholas (footballer then at Arsenal F.C.)
1984-12-01 Chaka Khan
1984-12-08 Cocteau Twins
1984-12-15 Siouxsie Sioux of Siouxsie and the Banshees
1984-12-22 Frankie Goes to Hollywood

1985
1985-01-05 The Triffids
1985-01-12 Frank Sinatra
1985-01-19 John Blake
1985-01-26 Spitting Image
1985-02-02 Smiley Culture
1985-02-09 Eddie Murphy
1985-02-16 No cover artist as such (but main articles were about The Jesus and Mary Chain and the Ramones)
1985-02-23 Morrissey
1985-03-02 Shelagh O'Hara Brookside soap
1985-03-09 Run-DMC
1985-03-16 James
1985-03-23 Los Lobos
1985-03-30 Alison Moyet
1985-04-06 The Long Ryders
1985-04-13 Lloyd Cole
1985-04-20 ABC
1985-04-27 Neil Kinnock
1985-05-04 Can music survive in the video age?
1985-05-11 Philip Chevron, Agnes Bernelle and Elvis Costello
1985-05-18 "Watching the Detectives" themed issue
1985-05-25 Free EP (no cover star as such, but lead story about Jimmy Somerville)
1985-06-01 Paul Weller (then of The Style Council)
1985-06-08 Morrissey
1985-06-15 Sting
1985-06-22 Bono
1985-06-29 Jimmy White
1985-07-06 R.E.M.
1985-07-13 Miles Davis
1985-07-20 Live Aid
1985-07-27 Theresa Russell
1985-08-03 Paddy McAloon of Prefab Sprout
1985-08-10 Madness
1985-08-17 The Pogues
1985-08-24 Propaganda
1985-08-31 Everything But The Girl
1985-09-07 The June Brides
1985-09-14 The Jesus and Mary Chain
1985-09-21 J.G.Thirlwell
1985-09-28 Bobby Womack
1985-10-05 Boxing and soul (article by Stuart Cosgrove)
1985-10-12 Fanzines
1985-10-19 Tom Waits
1985-10-26 Matt Dillon
1985-11-02 Fine Young Cannibals
1985-11-09 South Africa
1985-11-16 New Order
1985-11-23 Computer crimes
1985-11-30 The 100 Greatest albums ever made
1985-12-07 Cameo
1985-12-14 Robert Wyatt
1985-12-21 Del Boy and Rodney from Only Fools and Horses

1986
1986-01-04 The Cramps
1986-01-11 Andy Warhol and Debbie Harry
1986-01-18 Billy Bragg and Junior (Red Wedge issue)
1986-01-25 Easterhouse
1986-02-01 Punk – Ten Years On
1986-02-08 John Lydon
1986-02-15 Big Audio Dynamite
1986-02-22 Keith Richards
1986-03-01 Comics
1986-03-08 Sigue Sigue Sputnik
1986-03-15 Mantronix
1986-03-22 Absolute Beginners
1986-03-29 The Shop Assistants
1986-04-05 Hipsway
1986-04-12 Samantha Fox
1986-04-19 Test Dept
1986-04-26 Prince (blurred image)
1986-05-03 Sade
1986-05-10 Barry McGuigan
1986-05-17 Boy George
1986-05-24 Janet Jackson
1986-05-31 The Mighty Lemon Drops
1986-06-07 Morrissey
1986-06-14 Why British black music has no chance – polemical piece by Paolo Hewitt
1986-06-21 Sonic Youth
1986-06-28 George Michael
1986-07-05 The Jesus and Mary Chain
1986-07-12 Matt Johnson of The The
1986-07-19 Run-DMC
1986-07-26 Zodiac Mindwarp
1986-08-02 Jam and Lewis
1986-08-09 Chicago house
1986-08-16 Mick Hucknall of Simply Red
1986-08-23 David Sylvian
1986-08-30 Daley Thompson
1986-09-06 Dwight Yoakam
1986-09-13 The Yo Boys (article about hip hop by Paolo Hewitt)
1986-09-20 Sex (themed issue), also a free EP – Phil Oakey of The Human League
1986-09-27 Trouble Funk
1986-10-04 Blackie Lawless of W.A.S.P.
1986-10-11 Big Audio Dynamite
1986-10-18 Courtney Pine
1986-10-25 Voting (themed issue)
1986-11-01 Shinehead
1986-11-08 Youth suicide (themed issue)
1986-11-15 Cilla Black
1986-11-22 Swing Out Sister
1986-11-29 Sly and Robbie
1986-12-06 Elvis Presley (though the cover story in this issue, written by Stuart Cosgrove, was actually a criticism of the US military presence in Britain using Presley's image as symbolic, not an article about Presley himself)
1986-12-13 Madonna
1986-12-20 Pet Shop Boys

1987
1987-01-03 Robbie Coltrane
1987-01-10 The Style Council
1987-01-17 Beastie Boys
1987-01-24 Julian Cope
1987-01-31 Hot House
1987-02-07 Free EP given away – no cover star
1987-02-14 The Smiths
1987-02-21 The Bhundu Boys
1987-02-28 Terence Trent D'Arby
1987-03-07 Paula Yates
1987-03-14 U2
1987-03-21 Speed metal issue
1987-03-28 The Weather Prophets
1987-04-04 Salt-N-Pepa
1987-04-11 Baby Amphetamine
1987-04-18 Rhythm Kingdom issue
1987-04-25 Deacon Blue
1987-05-02 Shane MacGowan
1987-05-09 Def Jam
1987-05-16 Suzanne Vega
1987-05-23 The Housemartins
1987-05-30 The Blow Monkeys and Curtis Mayfield
1987-06-06 U2
1987-06-13 Neil Kinnock
1987-06-20 George Michael
1987-06-27 Trouble Funk
1987-07-04 Terence Trent D'Arby
1987-07-11 Steal It – The Pop Theft Epidemic
1987-07-18 Bruce Springsteen
1987-07-25 Gaye Bykers on Acid
1987-08-01 Hue and Cry
1987-08-08 The Jesus and Mary Chain
1987-08-15 The Primitives
1987-08-22 The Stupids
1987-08-29 Summer special
1987-09-05 Michelle Shocked
1987-09-12 That Petrol Emotion
1987-09-19 The Motorcycle Boy (an infamous issue in which this little-known indie band were elevated to the cover after a themed issue on censorship was itself censored, and Stuart Cosgrove sacked)
1987-09-26 Lloyd Cole
1987-10-03 Pop Will Eat Itself
1987-10-10 Chuck D and Eric B
1987-10-17 Los Lobos
1987-10-24 The Sugarcubes
1987-10-31 The Fall
1987-11-07 Eurythmics
1987-11-14 Coldcut
1987-11-21 Yargo
1987-11-28 Peter Gabriel
1987-12-05 The Cult
1987-12-12 Krush
1987-12-19 New Order

1988
1988-01-02 The Pogues
1988-01-09 Renegade Soundwave
1988-01-16 Red Hot Chili Peppers
1988-01-23 Sweet Tee
1988-01-30 70s special
1988-02-06 The Wedding Present
1988-02-13 Morrissey
1988-02-20 Sting
1988-02-27 Bomb the Bass
1988-03-05 The Madness
1988-03-12 Iron Maiden
1988-03-19 T'Pau
1988-03-26 James Brown
1988-04-02 R.E.M.
1988-04-09 The Wonder Stuff
1988-04-16 Harry Enfield (as Loadsamoney)
1988-04-23 Terence Trent D'Arby
1988-04-30 Nasty Rox Inc.
1988-05-07 Derek B
1988-05-14 Liverpool F.C.
1988-05-21 The Housemartins
1988-05-28 Billy Bragg
1988-06-04 UB40
1988-06-11 Pop Will Eat Itself
1988-06-18 Roddy Frame and Joe Strummer for Amnesty International
1988-06-25 Gary Glitter and The Justified Ancients of Mu Mu
1988-07-02 The Pogues
1988-07-09 Pink Floyd
1988-07-16 Acid house
1988-07-23 Hothouse Flowers
1988-07-30 The House of Love
1988-08-06 The Psychedelic Furs
1988-08-13 Nick Cave
1988-08-20 The Proclaimers
1988-08-27 The Primitives
1988-09-03 Björk of The Sugarcubes
1988-09-10 That Petrol Emotion
1988-09-17 Mark E. Smith
1988-09-24 The Mission
1988-10-01 Bananarama
1988-10-08 Public Enemy
1988-10-15 Pet Shop Boys
1988-10-22 U2
1988-10-29 Sinéad O'Connor
1988-11-05 Todd Terry
1988-11-12 Zeke Manyika
1988-11-19 Acid House crackdown
1988-11-26 Napalm Death
1988-12-03 Neneh Cherry
1988-12-10 Various artists ("Work Is A Four Letter Word – the dodgy pasts of your favourite artists")
1988-12-17 Bros
1988-12-24 Harry Enfield

1989
1989-01-07 Miles Hunt of The Wonder Stuff, Andrea of The Darling Buds and Guy Chadwick of The House of Love
1989-01-14 The Wedding Present
1989-01-21 Def Leppard
1989-01-28 New Order
1989-02-04 Jim Kerr of Simple Minds
1989-02-11 Morrissey
1989-02-18 Elvis Costello
1989-02-25 Mark E. Smith, Shane MacGowan and Nick Cave
1989-03-04 The Adult Net
1989-03-11 Sonic Youth
1989-03-18 Michael Hutchence of INXS
1989-03-25 Matt Johnson of The The
1989-04-01 Fine Young Cannibals
1989-04-08 Robert Smith of The Cure
1989-04-15 The Triffids
1989-04-22 Stevie Wonder
1989-04-29 Pop Will Eat Itself
1989-05-06 The Wonder Stuff
1989-05-13 Natalie Merchant of 10,000 Maniacs
1989-05-20 The Football/Rock connection
1989-05-27 Tanita Tikaram
1989-06-03 Peter Gabriel and Youssou N'Dour
1989-06-10 Lou Reed
1989-06-17 Danny Wilson (band)
1989-06-24 Tone Loc
1989-07-01 The Pogues
1989-07-08 Simple Minds
1989-07-15 Beastie Boys
1989-07-22 Birdland
1989-07-29 Fuzzbox
1989-08-05 Michael Stipe
1989-08-12 Eurythmics
1989-08-19 Pet Shop Boys and Liza Minnelli
1989-08-26 Ian McCulloch
1989-09-02 The Sugarcubes
1989-09-09 John Peel's 50th birthday
1989-09-16 Morrissey
1989-09-23 The Cult
1989-09-30 Jesus and Mary Chain
1989-10-07 Kate Bush
1989-10-14 Terence Trent D'Arby
1989-10-21 De La Soul
1989-10-28 Debbie Harry
1989-11-04 Wendy James
1989-11-11 Revenge
1989-11-18 The Stone Roses
1989-11-25 The Beautiful South
1989-12-02 Shaun Ryder and Tony Wilson
1989-12-09 Neneh Cherry
1989-12-16 U2
1989-12-23 The Stone Roses

1990
1990-01-06 The Sundays
1990-01-13 Sinéad O'Connor
1990-01-20 Mark E Smith of The Fall
1990-01-27 Lloyd Cole
1990-02-03 Guy Chadwick of The House of Love
1990-02-10 Birdland
1990-02-17 Depeche Mode
1990-02-24 Lemmy of Motörhead and Fuzzbox
1990-03-03 Inspiral Carpets
1990-03-10 'Travel Broadens The Mind' special, main feature Midnight Oil
1990-03-17 The Stone Roses
1990-03-24 Jazzie B of Soul II Soul
1990-03-31 Shaun Ryder of Happy Mondays
1990-04-07 Beats International
1990-04-14 Lenny Kravitz, and Slash
1990-04-21 My Bloody Valentine
1990-04-28 Billy Idol
1990-05-05 The Wonderstuff
1990-05-12 The Beautiful South
1990-05-19 John Barnes and Bernard Sumner of New Order
1990-05-26 Vic Reeves
1990-06-02 The Hothouse Flowers
1990-06-09 They Might Be Giants
1990-06-16 Northside
1990-06-23 Happy Mondays
1990-06-30 The Beloved
1990-07-07 Tim Booth of James
1990-07-14 Flowered Up
1990-07-21 Frank Black of The Pixies
1990-07-28 Bobby Gillespie of Primal Scream
1990-08-04 New Order
1990-08-11 Paddy McAloon of Prefab Sprout
1990-08-18 Electronic
1990-08-25 The Farm
1990-09-01 World Party
1990-09-08 Adamski
1990-09-15 Tim Burgess of The Charlatans
1990-09-22 Pet Shop Boys
1990-09-29 Mike Scott of The Waterboys
1990-10-06 Happy Mondays
1990-10-13 The Soup Dragons
1990-10-20 Lush
1990-10-27 Robert Smith of The Cure
1990-11-03 Public Enemy$3Public Enemy
1990-11-10 The Inspiral Carpets
1990-11-17 Betty Boo
1990-11-24 Donovan and Trevor and Simon
1990-12-01 Julee Cruise
1990-12-08 The Mission
1990-12-15 The Beautiful South
1990-12-22 Shaun Ryder and Bez

1991
1991-01-05 EMF
1991-01-12 The KLF
1991-01-19 PWEI
1991-01-26 Jesus Jones
1991-02-02 The Charlatans
1991-02-09 Dee Lite
1991-02-16 Happy Mondays
1991-02-23 The Farm
1991-03-02 Carter USM
1991-03-09 The Clash
1991-03-16 Inspiral Carpets
1991-03-23 R.E.M.
1991-03-30 Ned's Atomic Dustbin
1991-04-06 James
1991-04-13 The Wonder Stuff
1991-04-20 Johnny Marr
1991-04-27 Gary Clail
1991-05-04 Neil Young
1991-05-11 Manic Street Preachers
1991-05-18 Morrissey
1991-05-25 Pet Shop Boys
1991-06-01 Sinéad O'Connor
1991-06-08 The Shamen
1991-06-15 Erasure
1991-06-22 Anthrax
1991-06-29 Billy Bragg
1991-07-06 The Wedding Present
1991-07-13 Ice-T
1991-07-20 Blur
1991-07-27 Metallica
1991-08-03 The Farm
1991-08-10 Teenage Fan Club
1991-08-17 The Wonderstuff
1991-08-24 Neds Atomic Dustbin
1991-08-31 The Cult
1991-09-07 EMF
1991-09-14 David Bowie
1991-09-21 Carter USM
1991-09-28 Primal Scream
1991-10-05 Frank Black
1991-10-12 Chapterhouse
1991-10-19 Morrissey
1991-10-26 The Other Two (Stephen Morris and Gillian Gilbert from New Order)
1991-11-02 The Charlatans
1991-11-09 My Bloody Valentine
1991-11-16 Happy Mondays
1991-11-23 Nirvana
1991-11-30 Tony Wilson
1991-12-07 Vic & Bob
1991-12-14 The Wonderstuff
1991-12-21 EMF and Carter USM

1992
1992-01-04 Teenage Fanclub
1992-01-11 Kingmaker
1992-01-18 LFO
1992-01-25 James
1992-02-01 The Jesus and Mary Chain
1992-02-08 Ride
1992-02-15 Manic Street Preachers
1992-02-22 Curve
1992-02-29 The KLF
1992-03-07 Beautiful South
1992-03-14 The Senseless Things
1992-03-21 U2
1992-03-28 Blur
1992-04-04 PJ Harvey
1992-04-11 Carter USM
1992-04-18 The Cure & The Sisters Of Mercy
1992-04-25 Mega City Four
1992-05-02 Superchunk
1992-05-09 Morrissey (NME's 40th birthday issue)
1992-05-16 The Levellers
1992-05-23 The Fatima Mansions
1992-05-30 Manic Street Preachers
1992-06-06 The Disposable Heroes of Hiphoprisy
1992-06-13 U2
1992-06-20 Faith No More
1992-06-27 Carter USM
1992-07-04 Sonic Youth
1992-07-11 Cud
1992-07-18 Spiritualized
1992-07-25 Indie special, and The 100 Greatest Independent Records
1992-08-01 Lollapalooza
1992-08-08 Ice-T
1992-08-15 Babes In Toyland
1992-08-22 Morrissey
1992-08-29 Nirvana
1992-09-05 Suede
1992-09-12 The Frank and Walters
1992-09-19 The Sundays
1992-09-26 Madonna
1992-10-03 Manic Street Preachers
1992-10-10 The Orb
1992-10-17 Bob Mould
1992-10-24 Kingmaker
1992-10-31 Sinéad O'Connor
1992-11-07 Therapy?
1992-11-14 Carter USM
1992-11-21 Rob Newman & David Baddiel
1992-11-28 Nick Cave & Shane MacGowan
1992-12-05 Ice Cube
1992-12-12 The Wedding Present
1992-12-19 Suede

1993
1993-01-02 Michael Stipe of R.E.M.
1993-01-09 Back to the Planet
1993-01-16 Tanya Donelly
1993-01-23 Faith No More
1993-01-30 Julian Cope
1993-02-06 Saint Etienne
1993-02-13 Frank Black
1993-02-20 Brett Anderson of Suede
1993-02-27 The Shamen
1993-03-06 The Charlatans
1993-03-13 Ice-T
1993-03-20 David Bowie and Brett Anderson of Suede
1993-03-27 Evan Dando of The Lemonheads
1993-04-03 Bob Mould
1993-04-10 New Order
1993-04-17 Courtney Love
1993-04-24 PJ Harvey
1993-05-01 Rage Against the Machine
1993-05-08 Convoy Clampdown – an anti-Criminal Justice Bill special
1993-05-15 Stereo MC's
1993-05-22 U2
1993-05-29 The Stone Roses
1993-06-05 The Velvet Underground
1993-06-12 The Cure
1993-06-19 Teenage Fanclub
1993-06-26 Suede
1993-07-03 Glastonbury Festival
1993-07-10 Richey Edwards of Manic Street Preachers, MC Fusion of Credit to the Nation and Matty Blagg of Blaggers ITA
1993-07-17 The Black Crowes
1993-07-24 Nirvana
1993-07-31 Orbital
1993-08-07 The Breeders
1993-08-14 Björk
1993-08-21 New Order
1993-08-28 Carter USM
1993-09-04 Billy Corgan of The Smashing Pumpkins
1993-09-11 The Wonderstuff
1993-09-18 Vic & Bob
1993-09-25 Evan Dando of The Lemonheads
1993-10-02 Michael Jackson
1993-10-09 The Levellers
1993-10-16 Jamiroquai
1993-10-23 Senser
1993-10-30 The Orb
1993-11-06 Suede
1993-11-13 Rob Newman & David Baddiel
1993-11-20 Morrissey and Johnny Marr of The Smiths (to mark their tenth anniversary)
1993-11-27 John Lydon and Leftfield
1993-12-04 James
1993-12-11 Ice-T
1993-12-18 The Boo Radleys
1993-12-25 Björk and Evan Dando

1994
1994-01-08 Elastica
1994-01-15 Therapy?
1994-01-22 Primal Scream
1994-01-29 The Smashing Pumpkins
1994-02-05 Justine Frischmann, Thom Yorke and Brett Anderson
1994-02-12 The 10th anniversary of Creation Records
1994-02-19 Cypress Hill
1994-02-26 Elvis Costello
1994-03-05 Blur
1994-03-12 Kurt Cobain (in a coma following a drug overdose)
1994-03-19 Paul Weller
1994-03-26 Morrissey
1994-04-02 Nick Cave
1994-04-09 Jarvis Cocker of Pulp and Jo Brand
1994-04-16 Kurt Cobain (following his death)
1994-04-23 Courtney Love
1994-04-30 The Levellers
1994-05-07 Evan Dando
1994-05-14 Snoop Doggy Dogg
1994-05-21 Pet Shop Boys with Joanna Lumley and Jennifer Saunders (promoting Absolutely Fabulous single).
1994-05-28 Manic Street Preachers
1994-06-04 Oasis
1994-06-11 Crowded House
1994-06-18 Rage Against the Machine
1994-06-25 Blur
1994-07-02 Glastonbury Festival
1994-07-09 Brian Jones
1994-07-16 The Wonderstuff
1994-07-23 S*M*A*S*H
1994-07-30 Lollapalooza
1994-08-06 Oasis
1994-08-13 Bob Mould
1994-08-20 Red Hot Chili Peppers
1994-08-27 Primal Scream
1994-09-03 Suede
1994-09-10 Paul Weller
1994-09-17 R.E.M.
1994-09-24 The Cranberries
1994-10-01 Richey Edwards of Manic Street Preachers
1994-10-08 Blur
1994-10-15 The Prodigy
1994-10-22 Neil Young
1994-10-29 Suede
1994-11-05 Green Day
1994-11-12 The Black Crowes
1994-11-19 The Stone Roses
1994-11-26 Therapy?
1994-12-03 Chuck D and Ice Cube
1994-12-10 Beastie Boys
1994-12-17 Noel Gallagher and Justine Frischmann
1994-12-24 Michael Stipe of R.E.M.

1995
1995-01-07 Gene
1995-01-14 Suede
1995-01-21 Belly
1995-01-28 PJ Harvey
1995-02-04 Blur
1995-02-11 Elastica
1995-02-18 Faith No More
1995-02-25 Elton John
1995-03-04 The Stone Roses
1995-03-11 Prince
1995-03-18 The Boo Radleys
1995-03-25 East 17
1995-04-01 Tricky
1995-04-08 Nirvana
1995-04-15 Supergrass
1995-04-22 Björk
1995-04-29 Hole
1995-05-06 The Prodigy
1995-05-13 Paul Weller
1995-05-20 Therapy?
1995-05-27 Dodgy
1995-06-03 Rod Stewart
1995-06-10 Elastica
1995-06-17 Blur
1995-06-24 Robert Smith of The Cure
1995-07-01 Glastonbury Festival
1995-07-08 Keith Richards
1995-07-15 Neil Young
1995-07-22 R.E.M.
1995-07-29 The Cranberries
1995-08-05 Black Grape
1995-08-12 Blur and Oasis
1995-08-19 Foo Fighters
1995-08-26 Blur
1995-09-02 Green Day
1995-09-09 The Stone Roses, Oasis & The Boo Radleys
1995-09-16 Blur
1995-09-23 Pulp
1995-09-30 Oasis
1995-10-07 Kylie Minogue and Nick Cave
1995-10-14 Ash
2005-10-21 Bono
1995-10-28 Tricky
1995-11-04 Tim Burgess of The Charlatans
1995-11-11 The Beautiful South
1995-11-18 Jarvis Cocker
1995-11-25 David Bowie
1995-12-02 Madonna
1995-12-09 Radiohead
1995-12-16 Black Grape
1995-12-23 Oasis/Blur/Pulp

1996
1996-01-06 Ash
1996-01-13 The Bluetones
1996-01-20 Cast
1996-01-27 Nick Cave
1996-02-03 Noel Gallagher of Oasis
1996-02-10 Rocket From The Crypt
1996-02-17 Oasis
1996-02-24 Pulp
1996-03-02 Pulp
1996-03-09 Bruce Springsteen
1996-03-16 Garbage
1996-03-23 The Prodigy
1996-03-30 Black Grape
1996-04-06 The Stone Roses
1996-04-13 The Bluetones
1996-04-20 The Stone Roses
1996-04-27 Blur
1996-05-04 Liam Gallagher of Oasis
1996-05-11 Manic Street Preachers
1996-05-18 Baddiel & Skinner and The Lightning Seeds
1996-05-25 Dodgy
1996-06-01 Bis
1996-06-08 Ocean Colour Scene
1996-06-15 Sex Pistols
1996-06-22 Electronic
1996-06-29 Ash
1996-07-06 Dave Grohl of the Foo Fighters
1996-07-13 Underworld
1996-07-20 Björk
1996-07-27 Suede
1996-08-03 Robbie Williams
1996-08-10 Oasis
1996-08-17 Pulp
1996-08-24 R.E.M.
1996-08-31 The Stone Roses
1996-09-07 Oasis
1996-09-14 Metallica
1996-09-21 Oasis
1996-09-28 The Bluetones
1996-10-05 Chemical Brothers
1996-10-12 Manic Street Preachers
1996-10-19 Suede
1996-10-26 Garbage
1996-11-02 Baby Bird
1996-11-09 Kula Shaker
1996-11-16 Fugees
1996-11-23 Spice Girls
1996-11-30 Snoop Doggy Dogg
1996-12-07 Louise Wener of Sleeper
1996-12-14 Prince
1996-12-21 Noel and Liam Gallagher as part of a special wrapping paper style design for Christmas issue. Actual cover featured Dermot Morgan of Father Ted.

1997
1997-01-04 Elastica
1997-01-11 Blur
1997-01-18 Depeche Mode
1997-01-25 Reef
1997-02-01 Oasis
1997-02-08 Noel Gallagher of Oasis
1997-02-15 The Drugs Issue
1997-02-22 Space
1997-03-01 Kula Shaker
1997-03-08 U2
1997-03-15 The Divine Comedy
1997-03-22 The Charlatans
1997-03-29 Supergrass
1997-04-05 Cast
1997-04-12 Daft Punk
1997-04-19 Orbital
1997-04-26 The Seahorses
1997-05-03 Primal Scream
1997-05-10 Mansun
1997-05-17 Placebo
1997-05-24 Spiritualized
1997-05-31 The Charlatans
1997-06-07 The Verve
1997-06-14 Ocean Colour Scene
1997-06-21 Radiohead
1997-06-28 The Prodigy
1997-07-05 Glastonbury Festival
1997-07-12 Oasis
1997-07-19 Shaun Ryder
1997-07-26 Paul Weller
1997-08-02 The Prodigy
1997-08-09 Dave Grohl of Foo Fighters
1997-08-16 Blur
1997-08-23 The Verve
1997-08-30 Reading Festival
1997-09-06 Primal Scream
1997-09-13 Mark Morrison
1997-09-20 Oasis
1997-09-27 Mansun
1997-10-04 Oasis
1997-10-11 U2
1997-10-18 Ash
1997-10-25 Embrace
1997-11-01 Goldie
1997-11-08 Pulp
1997-11-15 Metallica
1997-11-22 The Charlatans & The Verve
1997-11-29 Blur
1997-12-06 The Fast Show
1997-12-13 Radiohead
1997-12-20 Oasis
1997-12-27 Oasis

1998
1998-01-03 Ian Brown
1998-01-10 Bernard Butler
1998-01-17 The Verve
1998-01-24 Stereophonics
1998-01-31 The Bluetones
1998-02-07 The Verve
1998-02-14 Cornershop
1998-02-21 Primal Scream
1998-02-28 Space
1998-03-07 Madonna
1998-03-14 Tony Blair (an attack on New Labour policy using the slogan "Rock and Roll takes on the Government")
1998-03-21 Garbage
1998-03-28 Pulp
1998-04-04 Lo Fidelity Allstars
1998-04-11 Massive Attack
1998-04-18 Vic Reeves, Neil Tennant and Brett Anderson
1998-04-25 Fatboy Slim
1998-05-02 Jeff Buckley
1998-05-09 Nick Cave
1998-05-16 Super Furry Animals
2008-05-23 Embrace
1998-05-30 The Verve
1998-06-06 Ultrasound
1998-06-13 Image of a burning guitar with a Union Jack design in the style of Noel Gallagher's, headline 'Why British music is going up in smoke'
1998-06-20 Mansun
1998-06-27 Damon Albarn
1998-07-04 Glastonbury Festival
1998-07-11 Beastie Boys
1998-07-18 The Verve
1998-07-25 The Beta Band
1998-08-01 Manic Street Preachers
1998-08-08 Placebo
1998-08-15 Embrace
1998-08-22 All Saints
1998-08-29 Robbie Williams (V Festival review)
1998-09-05 Reading and Leeds Festivals
1998-09-12 Marilyn Manson
1998-09-19 Manic Street Preachers
1998-09-26 Hole
1998-10-03 PJ Harvey
1998-10-10 Stereophonics
1998-10-17 Alanis Morissette
1998-10-24 R.E.M.
1998-10-31 Oasis
1998-11-07 Robbie Williams
1998-11-14 Beck
1998-11-21 Mercury Rev
1998-11-28 Fat Les
1998-12-05 Massive Attack
1998-11-14 Beck
1998-12-21 Manic Street Preachers

1999
1999-01-02 Gomez
1999-01-09 Idlewild
1999-01-16 Placebo
1999-01-23 Courtney Love and Michael Stipe
1999-01-30 South Park
1999-02-06 Ian Brown
1999-02-13 Blur
1999-02-20 Happy Mondays
1999-02-27 Blur
1999-03-06 Oasis
1999-03-13 Brett Anderson
1999-03-20 Aphex Twin
1999-03-27 Cerys Matthews of Catatonia
1999-04-03 Mogwai
1999-04-10 Stereophonics
1999-04-17 Armand Van Helden and Fatboy Slim
1999-04-24 Cast
1999-05-01 Marilyn Manson
1999-05-08 The Verve
1999-05-15 Supergrass
1999-05-22 Super Furry Animals
1999-05-29 Gay Dad
1999-06-05 The Chemical Brothers
1999-06-12 Liam Gallagher of Oasis
1999-06-19 Beta Band
1999-06-26 Glastonbury Festival
1999-07-03 Courtney Love
1999-07-10 Eminem
1999-07-17 Marilyn Manson
1999-07-24 Godspeed You! Black Emperor
1999-07-31 Travis
1999-08-07 The Charlatans
1999-08-14 Oasis
1999-08-21 Melanie C
1999-08-28 Manic Street Preachers
1999-09-04 Blur
1999-09-11 Leftfield
1999-09-18 Death In Vegas
1999-09-25 Manic Street Preachers
1999-10-02 Campag Velocet
1999-10-09 Manic Street Preachers
1999-10-16 Beck
1999-10-23 Mick Head of Shack
1999-10-30 The Halloween Project ("...in search of rock's worst nightmares")
1999-11-06 Embrace
1999-11-13 Primal Scream
1999-11-20 Beastie Boys
1999-11-27 Korn
1999-12-04 Fun Lovin' Criminals
1999-12-11 Oasis
1999-12-18 Oasis
1999-12-25 Richard Ashcroft

2000
2000-01-08 Slipknot
2000-01-15 Terris
2000-01-22 Asian Dub Foundation
2000-01-29 Rage Against the Machine
2000-02-05 NME Awards Preview
2000-02-12 Paul McCartney and Shaun Ryder
2000-02-19 Oasis
2000-02-26 Kelis
2000-03-04 AC/DC
2000-03-11 Embrace
2000-03-18 Cannabis 
2000-03-25 Coldplay
2000-04-01 Cypress Hill
2000-04-08 Stereophonics
2000-04-15 Ken Livingstone
2000-04-22 Eminem
2000-04-29 Ali G
2000-05-06 The Charlatans
2000-05-13 Anarchy in the UK (after the May Day violence in Trafalgar Square)
2000-05-20 Stuart Murdoch of Belle & Sebastian
2000-05-27 Doves
2000-06-03 Travis
2000-06-10 Napster
2000-06-17 Richard Ashcroft
2000-06-24 Radiohead
2000-07-01 Glastonbury Festival
2000-07-08 Coldplay
2000-07-15 Oasis
2000-07-22 Craig David
2000-07-29 Queens of the Stone Age
2000-08-05 Bloodhound Gang
2000-08-12 Eminem
2000-08-19 Richard Ashcroft
2000-08-26 Oasis
2000-09-02 Limp Bizkit
2000-09-09 Marilyn Manson
2000-09-16 Slipknot
2000-09-23 At the Drive-In
2000-09-30 Muse
2000-10-07 Moby & Kelis
2000-10-14 U2
2000-10-21 Fatboy Slim
2000-10-28 The Live Issue
2000-11-04 Damon Albarn
2000-11-11 Wu-Tang Clan
2000-11-18 Amen
2000-11-25 Kelly Jones
2000-12-02 David Bowie
2000-12-09 "The Pictures They Didn't Want You To See"
2000-12-16 Badly Drawn Boy
2000-12-23 Christmas issue

2001
2001-01-06 32 New Stars For 2001
2001-01-13 Manic Street Preachers
2001-01-20 JJ72
2001-01-27 "Sex, Drugs & Rock Journalism
2001-02-03 Amen, Starsailor, JJ72 & Alfie (NME Tour)
2001-02-10 Hip hop Special
2001-02-17 NME Awards special – Bono, Noel and Liam Gallagher
2001-02-24 Popstars
2001-03-03 Manic Street Preachers
2001-03-10 Stereophonics
2001-03-17 Gorillaz & Daft Punk
2001-03-24 Britain's Youth
2001-03-31 Missy Elliott
2001-04-07 Miami Dance Conference
2001-04-14 Starsailor
2001-04-21 "We Love NY"
2001-04-28 Destiny's Child
2001-05-05 Mogwai
2001-05-12 Basement Jaxx
2001-05-19 Radiohead
2001-05-26 Air
2001-06-02 Pulp
2001-06-09 The Strokes
2001-06-16 Outkast
2001-06-23 Travis
2001-06-30 Super Furry Animals
2001-07-07 Aaliyah
2001-07-14 Roger Sanchez
2001-07-21 Spiritualized
2001-07-28 Summer 2001 Riots
2001-08-04 Mercury Rev
2001-08-11 The White Stripes
2001-08-18 The Charlatans
2001-08-25 The Strokes
2001-09-01 Eminem (Reading and Leeds Festivals review)
2001-09-08 Slipknot
2001-09-15 Courtney Love
2001-09-22 Starsailor
2001-09-29 Oasis
2001-10-06 Aphex Twin
2001-10-13 Gorillaz
2001-10-20 Andrew WK
2001-10-27 "Guitar Britain"
2001-11-03 The White Stripes
2001-11-10 Muse
2001-11-17 Cannabis (New Laws)
2001-11-24 So Solid Crew
2001-12-01 Courtney Love
2001-12-08 Top 50 Albums of the Year
2001-12-15 NME Review of the Year

2002
2002-01-05 Black Rebel Motorcycle Club
2002-01-12 Jay-Z
2002-01-19 Travis, Ryan Adams & Starsailor
2002-01-26 Jimmy Eat World (emo special)
2002-02-02 The Hives
2002-02-09 Richard Ashcroft & The Chemical Brothers
2002-02-16 Oasis
2002-02-23 Kylie Minogue
2002-03-02 The Strokes
2002-03-09 The Strokes & Kylie Minogue
2002-03-16 The Streets
2002-03-23 System of a Down
2002-03-30 The Lostprophets
2002-04-06 Oasis
2002-04-13 Doves
2002-04-20 Oasis (50th Birthday issue)
2002-04-27 Hundred Reasons
2002-05-04 The Hives
2002-05-11 Eminem
2002-05-18 Black Rebel Motorcycle Club
2002-05-25 The Osbournes
2002-06-01 The Vines
2002-06-08 The Libertines
2002-06-15 Oasis
2002-06-22 The Prodigy
2002-06-29 Coldplay
2002-07-06 Glastonbury Festival
2002-07-13 Oasis
2002-07-20 The Vines
2002-07-27 The Coral
2002-08-03 Radiohead
2002-08-10 Queens of the Stone Age
2002-08-17 The Music
2002-08-24 The Strokes
2002-08-31 The White Stripes
2002-09-07 Coldplay
2002-09-14 Black Rebel Motorcycle Club
2002-09-21 Oasis
2002-09-28 The Cooper Temple Clause
2002-10-05 The Datsuns
2002-10-12 The Vines
2002-10-19 The Libertines
2002-10-26 Queens of the Stone Age
2002-11-02 The White Stripes
2002-11-09 Nirvana
2002-11-16 The Strokes
2002-11-23 Foo Fighters
2002-11-30 Black Rebel Motorcycle Club
2002-12-07 The Streets
2002-12-14 Oasis
21 & 2002-12-28 Coldplay

2003
2003-01-04 Radiohead
2003-01-11 Joe Strummer
2003-01-18 Eminem
2003-01-25 The Datsuns
2003-02-01 Kelly Osbourne
2003-02-08 The Vines
2003-02-15 Courtney Love
2003-02-22 Coldplay & Oasis
2003-03-01 The White Stripes
2003-03-08 Yeah Yeah Yeahs
2003-03-15 Oasis
2003-03-22 Avril Lavigne
2003-03-29 Interpol
2003-04-05 The White Stripes
2003-04-12 Yeah Yeah Yeahs
2003-04-19 Hot Hot Heat
2003-04-26 Coldplay
2003-05-03 Radiohead
2003-05-10 The Music
2003-05-17 Blur
2003-05-24 Radiohead
2003-05-31 The Strokes
2003-06-07 AFI
2003-06-14 Black Rebel Motorcycle Club
2003-06-21 Eminem, 50 Cent & Dr. Dre
2003-06-28 The Polyphonic Spree
2003-07-05 Glastonbury 2003/Radiohead
2003-07-12 Kings of Leon
2003-07-19 The Flaming Lips
2003-07-26 The Coral
2003-08-02 The Darkness
2003-08-09 Keith Richards
2003-08-16 The Strokes
2003-08-23 Jet/Reading & Leeds Festival (Preview)
2003-08-30 The Darkness/Reading & Leeds Festival (Review)
2003-09-06 The Cooper Temple Clause
2003-09-13 Muse
2003-09-20 The Strokes
2003-09-27 The White Stripes
2003-10-04 The Darkness
2003-10-11 Kings of Leon
2003-10-18 The Libertines
2003-10-25 The Strokes
2003-11-01 The Distillers
2003-11-08 Kylie Minogue
2003-11-15 The Beatles
2003-11-22 "Rock N Roll Riot"
2003-11-29 Cool List 2003
2003-12-06 Radiohead
2003-12-13 Nirvana
2003-12-20 The Libertines

2004
2004-01-03 Oasis
2004-01-10 Franz Ferdinand
2004-01-17 Sid Vicious
2004-01-24 Funeral for a Friend
2004-01-31 The Coral
2004-02-07 Courtney Love
2004-02-14 Outkast
2004-02-21 The Distillers, Franz Ferdinand & Radiohead
2004-02-28 The Vines
2004-03-06 Jet
2004-03-13 The Libertines
2004-03-20 The Strokes
2004-03-27 Franz Ferdinand
2004-04-03 Scissor Sisters
2004-04-10 Kurt Cobain
2004-04-17 Morrissey
2004-04-24 The Vines
2004-05-01 Franz Ferdinand
2004-05-08 Muse
2004-05-15 Radiohead
2004-05-22 Franz Ferdinand & Morrissey
2004-05-29 Pixies
2004-06-05 The Hives
2004-06-12 Razorlight
2004-06-19 Morrissey
2004-06-26 Glastonbury Festival preview
2004-07-03 Paul McCartney (Glastonbury Festival review)
2004-07-10 Liam Gallagher
2004-07-17 Muse
2004-07-24 The Libertines
2004-07-31 The Hives
2004-08-07 The Streets
2004-08-14 Franz Ferdinand
2004-08-28 The White Stripes
2004-09-04 Carl Barat
2004-09-11 The White Stripes
2004-09-18 1001 Rock Facts
2004-09-25 Marilyn Manson
2004-10-02 The White Stripes
2004-10-09 Goldie Lookin Chain
2004-10-16 Babyshambles
2004-10-23 Kings of Leon
2004-10-30 Scissor Sisters
2004-11-06 John Peel (after his death)
2004-11-13 The Strokes
2004-11-20 Green Day
2004-11-27 Pete Doherty (Cool List 2004)
2004-12-04 Kasabian
2004-12-11 The Best of 2004 (Albums, Tracks and DVDs)
2004-12-18 Muse
2004-12-25 U2

2005
2005-01-08 Franz Ferdinand
2005-01-15 Bloc Party
2005-01-22 The Killers
2005-01-29 Richey Edwards of Manic Street Preachers (10th Anniversary of his disappearance)
2005-02-05 Razorlight
2005-02-12 The Others
2005-02-19 Green Day
2005-02-26 Shockwaves NME Awards 2005
2005-03-05 New Order
2005-03-12 The Bravery
2005-03-19 Kaiser Chiefs
2005-03-26 Gwen Stefani
2005-04-09 Kasabian
2005-04-16 Bloc Party
2005-04-23 Coldplay
2005-04-30 Oasis
2005-05-07 Foo Fighters
2005-05-14 The Killers
2005-05-21 Foo Fighters
2005-05-28 The White Stripes
2005-06-04 Oasis
2005-06-11 Pete Doherty
2005-06-18 Green Day
2005-06-25 Glastonbury Festival (Preview)
2005-07-02 Glastonbury Festival (Review)
2005-07-09 Live 8 Souvenir issue
2005-07-16 Kaiser Chiefs & Foo Fighters
2005-07-23 Babyshambles
2005-07-30 Franz Ferdinand
2005-08-06 Kaiser Chiefs
2005-08-13 The Magic Numbers
2005-08-20 Oasis
2005-08-27 Pixies
2005-09-03 Carling Weekend
2005-09-10 Ian Brown
2005-09-17 Bloc Party
2005-09-24 The Killers
2005-10-01 The Strokes
2005-10-08 Babyshambles
2005-10-15 John Peel
2005-10-22 Kaiser Chiefs
2005-10-29 Arctic Monkeys
2005-11-05 Little Britain
2005-11-12 The White Stripes
2005-11-19 Green Day for 'Gigs of the Year'
2005-11-26 Cool List 2005
2005-12-03 Albums of the Year: 2005
2005-12-10 Oasis
2005-12-17 The Strokes
2005-12-24 Morrissey

2006
2006-01-04 Richard Ashcroft
2006-01-11 Dirty Pretty Things
2006-01-18 Arctic Monkeys
2006-01-25 100 Greatest British Albums Ever
2006-02-01 Arctic Monkeys
2006-02-08 The Ordinary Boys
2006-02-15 Maxïmo Park and Arctic Monkeys
2006-02-22 Morrissey
2006-03-01 NME Awards Special – Ian Brown and Arctic Monkeys
2006-03-08 The Strokes
2006-03-15 The Streets
2006-03-22 Yeah Yeah Yeahs
2006-03-29 Kasabian
2006-04-05 Radiohead
2006-04-12 Primal Scream
2006-04-19 Fall Out Boy
2006-04-26 Arctic Monkeys
2006-05-03 The Raconteurs
2006-05-10 Heroes
2006-05-17 Razorlight
2006-05-24 Radiohead
2006-05-31 Foo Fighters
2006-06-07 The Smiths
2006-06-14 Soundtrack of the Summer
2006-06-21 The Kooks
2006-06-28 The Killers
2006-07-05 Kasabian
2006-07-12 Lily Allen
2006-07-19 Syd Barrett
2006-07-26 Pete Doherty
2006-08-02 Oasis
2006-08-09 The Horrors
2006-08-16 Radiohead
2006-08-23 Arctic Monkeys
2006-08-30 Reading and Leeds Festival
2006-09-06 Kasabian
2006-09-13 War on Emo
2006-09-20 Nirvana
2006-09-27 Jarvis Cocker
2006-10-04 Klaxons
2006-10-11 The Automatic
2006-10-18 Panic! at the Disco
2006-10-25 My Chemical Romance
2006-11-01 Mike Skinner and Pete Doherty
2006-11-08 Oasis
2006-11-15 U2 and Green Day
2006-11-22 Muse
2006-11-29 Carl Barat
2006-12-06 Albums of the Year: 2006
2006-12-13 The Killers
2006-12-20 The Good, the Bad & the Queen

2007
2007-01-03 Arctic Monkeys
2007-01-10 The View
2007-01-17 James Brown (after his death)
2007-01-24 My Chemical Romance
2007-01-31 Bloc Party
2007-02-07 Kaiser Chiefs
2007-02-14 Oasis (3 Special Edition Covers Available)
2007-02-21 Arcade Fire
2007-02-28 The Gossip
2007-03-07 NME Awards
2007-03-14 NME Awards (With Free DVD)
2007-03-21 Arctic Monkeys (Issue Came With Free Stickers)
2007-03-28 The Twang
2007-04-07 My Chemical Romance
2007-04-14 Noel Gallagher
2007-04-21 The Libertines
2007-04-25 Arctic Monkeys
2007-05-02 The Greatest Indie Anthems Ever
2007-05-09 The White Stripes
2007-05-16 The Clash
2007-05-23 Festival Special (Lovefoxxx & Klaxons)
2007-05-30 Beth Ditto
2007-06-06 The White Stripes (Issue came with free 7-inch vinyl of The White Stripes single Rag and Bone)
2007-06-13 Muse (Issue came with free compilation CD of some of Muse's favourite bands)
2007-06-20 Glastonbury 2007 (Tom Meighan of Kasabian, Nicky Wire of Manic Street Preachers and Tom Clarke of The Enemy)
2007-06-27 Glastonbury 2007 Lindsey Inman (Includes free posters of the Glastonbury Festival weekend)
2007-07-04 Johnny Borrell, lead singer of band Razorlight
2007-07-11 The View
2007-07-18 The Enemy
2007-07-25 Kate Nash & Jack Peñate
2007-08-01 Arctic Monkeys
2007-08-08 Pete Doherty
2007-08-18 Tony Wilson (after his death)
2007-08-25 Carling Weekend Preview
2007-09-01 Carling Weekend Review, features image of The Enemy and Festival crowds
2007-09-08 Kate Nash
2007-09-15 Babyshambles (Issue came with free 7-inch vinyl of Babyshambles demo of the single Delivery)
2007-09-22 Ian Brown
2007-09-29 Klaxons
2007-10-06 The Verve
2007-10-13 Radiohead
2007-10-20 Various bands and artists promoting the free Love Music Hate Racism CD that came free with the issue.
2007-10-27 Oasis
2007-11-03 Foo Fighters (Halloween issue)
2007-11-10 Frank Carter (Cool List 2007)
2007-11-17 Bloc Party  (Issue came free with CD of remixes of their single Flux)
2007-11-24 The Mighty Boosh
2007-12-01 Morrissey
2007-12-08 Radiohead
2007-12-15 The Top 100 Albums and Tracks of the Year 2007
22 – 2007-12-29 Arctic Monkeys (Christmas Issue)

2008
2008-01-05 Matt Bellamy, of the band Muse: The Guitar Issue (Free chords and lyrics)
2008-01-12 Foals (New Noise 2008)
2008-01-19 Pete Doherty (New Albums of 2008)
2008-01-26 The Cribs
2008-02-02 Lightspeed Champion
2008-02-09 Manic Street Preachers
2008-02-16 The Wombats
2008-02-23 Beth Ditto and Jarvis Cocker
2008-03-01 Manic Street Preachers: 'Godlike Geniuses' 2008
2008-03-08 Muse, Arctic Monkeys, Klaxons and The Mighty Boosh (NME Awards 2008)
2008-03-15 Muse
2008-03-22 Panic! at the Disco
2008-03-29 The Last Shadow Puppets
2008-04-05 Brandon Flowers, of the band The Killers
2008-04-12 The Courteeners
2008-04-19 The Enemy
2008-04-26 Crystal Castles (The Future 50)
2008-05-03 Green Day
2008-05-10 Coldplay (Issue came with free 7-inch vinyl of Coldplay's Single 'Violet Hill' and a B-Side of 'A Spell A Rebel Yell')
2008-05-17 Pete Doherty
2008-05-24 Scarlett Johansson
2008-05-31 Kaiser Chiefs (Free posters)
2008-06-07 MGMT (Festival Guide 2008)
2008-06-14 The Mighty Boosh
2008-06-21 Glasvegas
2008-06-28 Kings of Leon: Glastonbury 2008 Preview
2008-07-05 Jay-Z: Glastonbury 2008 Review
2008-07-12 CSS
2008-07-19 The Verve: T in the Park and Oxegen 2008 Review
2008-07-26 Primal Scream
2008-07-02 Vampire Weekend: Top 25 American bands
2008-08-09 Noel Gallagher
2008-08-16 Muse
2008-08-23 Brandon Flowers of the band The Killers (Reading And Leeds Festival 2008 preview)
2008-08-30 Rage Against the Machine(Reading And Leeds Festival 2008 review)
2008-09-06 Kings of Leon
2008-09-13 Late of the Pier
2008-09-20 Oasis (included a free Oasis CD-ROM to accompany the album Dig Out Your Soul)
2008-09-27 Fucked Up
2008-10-04 Glasvegas
2008-10-11 Crystal Castles
2008-10-18 The Cribs
2008-10-25 The Last Shadow Puppets
2008-11-01 The Cure
2008-11-08 Oasis
2008-11-15 The Mighty Boosh
2008-11-22 The Strokes
2008-11-29 The Killers
2008-12-06 MGMT
2008-12-13 Blur and the Top 50 Albums & Tracks of 2008
2008-12-20 to 2008-12-27 The Mighty Boosh and Kings of Leon. 100 page Christmas Special with four free posters.

2009
2009-01-03 Photo Yearbook Special, with cover featuring James Allan of Glasvegas, Scarlett Johansson, Caleb Followill of Kings of Leon, Liam Gallagher of Oasis, Katie White of The Ting Tings, Brandon Flowers of The Killers and Alex Turner of The Last Shadow Puppets (and Arctic Monkeys).
2009-01-10 Florence + the Machine (NME'''s "10 Tips for 2009" Feature)
2009-01-17 Kasabian (Albums of 2009: In The Studio [Part 1])
2009-01-24 Lily Allen (Albums of 2009: In The Studio [Part 2])
2009-01-31 Franz Ferdinand (Albums of 2009: In The Studio [Part 3])
2009-02-07 Effy Stonem, James Cook and Freddie McClair of Skins.
2009-02-14 Pete Doherty
2009-02-21 Gerard Way
2009-02-28 White Lies
2009-03-07 NME Awards Special, with cover featuring Brandon Flowers of The Killers, Robert Smith of The Cure, Noel Fielding of The Mighty Boosh, Pete Doherty and Andrew VanWyngarden of MGMT.
2009-03-14 Yeah Yeah Yeahs
2009-03-21 The Prodigy
2009-03-28 The Enemy
2009-04-04 Kings of Leon
2009-04-11 The Horrors
2009-04-18 The Stone Roses
2009-04-25 Green Day
2009-05-02 Brandon Flowers of the band The Killers
2009-05-09 Lily Allen
2009-05-16 Richey Edwards of Manic Street Preachers
2009-05-23 Arctic Monkeys
2009-05-30 Kasabian
2009-06-06 Billie Joe Armstrong of Green Day
2009-06-13 Oasis
2009-06-20 Ian Curtis
2009-06-27 Blur
2009-07-04 Michael Jackson
2009-07-11 Simon Neil of Biffy Clyro
2009-07-18 Kings of Leon
2009-07-25 Muse
2009-08-01 The Cribs
2009-08-08 The Future 50, featuring La Roux
2009-08-15 Julian Casablancas
2009-08-22 Liam Gallagher
2009-08-29 Arctic Monkeys
2009-09-05 Oasis
2009-09-12 The Beatles – 13 special covers
2009-09-19 Muse
2009-09-26 Dizzee Rascal
2009-10-03 Ian Brown and Jay-Z
2009-10-10 Kurt Cobain
2009-10-17 Jamie T
2009-10-24 Paramore
2009-10-31 Kasabian
2009-11-07 Arctic Monkeys
2009-11-14 Them Crooked Vultures
2009-11-21 Ten Years In Music end of decade special
2009-11-28 Florence + the Machine
2009-12-05 Babyshambles
2009-12-12 50 Best Albums Of 2009, featuring Faris Badwan2009-12-19 & 2009-12-26 Simon Cowell

2010
2010-01-02 Oasis
2010-01-09 The Drums
2010-01-16 Albums Of 2010 special
2010-01-23 Gerard Way
2010-01-30 The xx
2010-02-06 The Specials
2010-02-13 The Courteeners
2010-02-20 Vampire Weekend
2010-02-27 The Maccabees
2010-03-06 NME Awards
2010-03-13 Gorillaz
2010-03-20 MGMT
2010-03-27 Mumford & Sons
2010-04-03 The Libertines
2010-04-10 Ten different covers – Jack White, Florence and the Machine, LCD Soundsystem, Rihanna, Kasabian, Laura Marling, Foals, M.I.A., Biffy Clyro, Magnetic Man
2010-04-17 Malcolm McLaren
2010-04-24 Courtney Love
2010-05-01 The Dead Weather
2010-05-08 Foals
2010-05-15 M.I.A.
2010-05-22 Ian Curtis
2010-05-29 The Drums
2010-06-05 Sergio Pizzorno of Kasabian and Russell Brand
2010-06-12 The 50 most fearless people in music, featuring Kele Okereke
2010-06-19 The Strokes
2010-06-26 Glastonbury Festival 2010 Preview (Glastonbury 40th anniversary special)
2010-07-03 Glastonbury Festival 2010 Review, featuring Muse
2010-07-10 Kings of Leon
2010-07-17 Eminem
2010-07-24 Klaxons
2010-07-31 Arcade Fire
2010-08-06 Mark Ronson
2010-08-13 Jimi Hendrix
2010-08-17 Kings of Leon
2010-08-24 The Libertines (Reading and Leeds preview)
2010-09-01 The Libertines (Reading and Leeds review)
2010-09-08 Oasis
2010-09-15 The xx
2010-09-22 Carl Barât
2010-09-29 David Bowie
2010-10-06 Mumford & Sons
2010-10-13 The Inbetweeners
2010-10-20 Cool List 2010
2010-10-27 Elliott Smith
2010-11-04 Warpaint
2010-11-11 My Chemical Romance
2010-11-18 Pulp
2010-11-25 Paul Weller
2010-12-02 The 50 Best albums of 20102010-12-09 John Lennon
2010-12-16 Beady Eye (Christmas Double Issue)
2010-12-30 The 50 Best Albums You've Never Heard (chosen by Dave Grohl, Kasabian and Paul Weller)

2011
2011-01-06 New Music 2011 Special – Two different covers – The Vaccines and Viva Brother
2011-01-13 Albums of 2011 Special
2011-01-20 White Lies
2011-01-29 Glasvegas
2011-02-01 Screamadelica – Primal Scream – The 50 Druggiest Albums Ever
2011-02-07 The White Stripes
2011-02-15 The Strokes
2011-02-21 Liam Gallagher
2011-02-28 NME Awards 2011
2011-03-08 Sex Pistols – 100 Gigs You Should Have Been At
2011-03-15 The Vaccines
2011-03-22 Muse (Reading and Leeds festival line-up announcement)
2011-03-29 Beady Eye
2011-04-06 Arctic Monkeys
2011-04-13 Foo Fighters
2011-04-18 Lady Gaga
2011-04-26 Tyler The Creator
2011-05-03 Friendly Fires
2011-05-10 The Libertines
2011-05-17 Creation Records
2011-05-24 Syd Barrett
2011-05-31 Kasabian
2011-06-08 Arctic Monkeys
2011-06-14 The Smiths
2011-06-21 Bono
2011-06-29 Glastonbury 2011
2011-07-09 Jim Morrison
2011-07-16 Foo Fighters
2011-07-23 Noel Gallagher
2011-07-26 Amy Winehouse
2011-08-02 The Horrors
2011-08-09 The Clash
16/08 11 UK Riots Special Report
2011-08-23 Muse (Reading and Leeds preview)
2011-08-30 Jarvis Cocker (from Pulp) and Julian Casablancas (from The Strokes) – Reading and Leeds review
2011-09-06 Nirvana (Nevermind 20th Anniversary Special)
2011-09-13 Bombay Bicycle Club
2011-09-20 Kasabian
2011-09-27 Noel Gallagher
2011-10-04 Manic Street Preachers
2011-10-11 Florence + the Machine
2011-10-18 The Stone Roses
2011-10-25 The Stone Roses
2011-11-02 Arctic Monkeys
2011-11-09 Liam Gallagher
2011-11-16 The Vaccines
2011-11-23 Cool List 2011
2011-11-30 Amy Winehouse
2011-12-07 The Best Albums and Tracks of 20112011-12-14 – 2011-12-21 Noel Fielding & Kasabian (Double Christmas Issue)
2011-12-28 The Beatles

2012
2012-01-04 100 New Bands You Have To Hear
2012-01-11 The Maccabees
2012-01-18 Albums of 2012, featuring The Stone Roses, Biffy Clyro, Pete Doherty, The Killers and Lana Del Rey
2012-01-25 Lana Del Rey
2012-02-01 Noel Fielding
2012-02-08 100 Great Albums You've Never Heard
2012-02-15 Noel Gallagher
2012-02-22 Blur
2012-02-29 Sex Pistols
2012-03-07 NME Awards 2012 featuring 'Godlike Genius' Noel Gallagher, Kasabian, Florence and the Machine and Jarvis Cocker
2012-03-14 The Cure (Reading and Leeds line-up announcement)
2012-03-21 Jack White
2012-03-28 Plan B
2012-04-04 Pete Doherty
2012-04-11 Paul Weller and Miles Kane (Heroes Edition)
2012-04-18 Arctic Monkeys
2012-04-25 John Lydon
2012-05-01 2012 Summer Festivals Preview
2012-05-08 Alabama Shakes
2012-05-15 the Ramones
2012-05-22 The Hot List
2012-05-29 The Stone Roses
2012-06-05 David Bowie
2012-06-12 Mumford & Sons
2012-06-19 100 Greatest Songs of NME's Lifetime2012-06-26 The Stone Roses
2012-07-03 The Stone Roses
2012-07-10 Florence + the Machine
2012-07-17 The Rolling Stones
2012-07-24 Muse
2012-07-31 Two Door Cinema Club
2012-08-07 Joe Strummer
2012-08-14 The Killers
2012-08-21 The Vaccines (Reading and Leeds 2012 preview)
2012-08-28 Foo Fighters and Green Day (Reading and Leeds 2012 review)
2012-09-04 Kurt Cobain
2012-09-11 Joy Division
2012-09-18 John Lennon
2012-09-25 NME 60th Anniversary Special – 8 covers available: Liam Gallagher, Paul Weller, Arctic Monkeys, Noel Gallagher, Patti Smith, The Killers, Manic Street Preachers and John Lydon
2012-10-01 Palma Violets
2012-10-09 The Libertines
2012-10-16 Muse
2012-10-23 Mike Skinner
2012-10-30 Crystal Castles
2012-11-06 The Ultimate Band2012-11-13 Jake Bugg
2012-11-20 Alt-J
2012-11-27 The Best 50 Tracks and Albums of 20122012-12-04 The 75 Moments That Defined 20122012-12-11 & 2012-12-18 Keith Richards (Christmas Double Issue)
2012-12-25 The Greatest No. 1 Records in History2013
2013-01-02 Palma Violets and Haim (New Music Special)
2013-01-08 Liam Gallagher
2013-01-15 David Bowie
2013-01-22 Foals
2013-01-29 Biffy Clyro
2013-02-05 Hurts
2013-02-12 Johnny Marr
2013-02-19 The Cribs
2013-02-26 David Bowie
2013-03-05 NME Awards 2013, featuring 'Godlike Genius' Johnny Marr
2013-03-12 Reading Festival 2013 Preview, featuring Green Day, Biffy Clyro and Eminem
2013-03-19 Dave Grohl
2013-03-26 Peace
2013-04-02 The Stone Roses and Shane Meadows
2013-04-09 Karen O
2013-04-16 The Soundtrack of Our Lives, featuring Frank Turner
2013-04-23 Vampire Weekend
2013-04-30 The Vaccines
2013-05-07 The 100 Greatest Britpop Songs
2013-05-14 Daft Punk
2013-05-21 Josh Homme
2013-05-28 Miles Kane
2013-06-04 Liam Gallagher
2013-06-11 The Who
2013-06-18 The Killers
2013-06-25 Glastonbury Festival 2013 (Preview)
2013-07-02 Arctic Monkeys (Glastonbury Festival 2013 Review)
2013-07-09 Bobby Gillespie
2013-07-16 Jay-Z
2013-07-23 Babyshambles
2013-07-30 Arctic Monkeys
2013-08-06 40 Years of Hip-Hop
2013-08-13 Disclosure
2013-08-20 Nine Inch Nails (Reading and Leeds Festival preview)
2013-08-27 Reading and Leeds Festival 2013 review
2013-09-03 Arctic Monkeys
2013-09-10 Nirvana
2013-09-17 Franz Ferdinand
2013-09-24 Haim
2013-10-01 Paul McCartney
2013-10-08 David Bowie
2013-10-15 Young Britannia
2013-10-22 The 500 Greatest Albums of All-Time
2013-10-29 Arcade Fire
2013-11-05 Lou Reed
2013-11-12 M.I.A.
2013-11-19 Pixies
2013-11-26 Arctic Monkeys
2013-12-03 The 50 Best Albums and Tracks of 2013
2013-12-10 The Images That Defined 2013
2013-12-17 Ozzy Osbourne (Christmas Double Issue)
2013-12-31 The Issue They Didn't Want You To See

2014
2014-01-07 Chance The Rapper
2014-01-14 Kasabian
2014-01-21 John Lennon
2014-01-28 1994: The Year That Changed Music
2014-02-04 The 500 Greatest Songs of All-Time
2014-02-11 Metronomy
2014-02-18 The Smiths
2014-02-25 Alex Turner
2014-03-04 NME Awards 2014 featuring Damon Albarn, John Cooper Clarke, Paul McCartney and Alex Turner
2014-03-11 Reading Festival 2014 preview featuring Peace, Wolf Alice and Temples
2014-03-18 The Horrors
2014-03-25 Julian Casablancas and Cerebral Ballzy (Heroes Edition)
2014-04-01 Kurt Cobain
2014-04-08 Damon Albarn
2014-04-15 Foals
2014-04-22 The Stone Roses
2014-04-29 The Libertines
2014-05-06 Skrillex
2014-05-13 101 Albums To Hear Before You Die
2014-05-20 Arctic Monkeys
2014-05-27 Led Zeppelin
2014-06-03 Pulp
2014-06-10 Jack White
2014-06-17 Kasabian
2014-06-24 Glastonbury Festival 2014 (Preview)
2014-07-01 Arcade Fire (Glastonbury Festival 2014 Review)
2014-07-08 The Libertines
2014-07-15 Morrissey
2014-07-22 Manic Street Preachers
2014-07-29 Jake Bugg
2014-08-05 The 100 Most Influential Artists Ever
2014-08-12 Manic Street Preachers
2014-08-19 Oasis
2014-08-26 Palma Violets (Reading and Leeds Festival 2014 Review)
2014-09-03 Interpol
2014-09-10 Nick Cave
2014-09-17 Royal Blood
2014-09-24 Jamie T
2014-10-01 Johnny Marr
2014-10-08 Ian Curtis
2014-10-15 David Bowie
2014-10-22 Noel Gallagher
2014-10-29 Liam Gallagher
2014-11-05 Foo Fighters
2014-11-12 Carl Barat
2014-11-19 Julian Casablancas
2014-11-26 The 50 Best Albums of 2014
2014-12-03 St. Vincent
2014-12-10 Kasabian
2014-12-17 The Killers (Christmas Double Issue)

2015

2015-01-03 50 Best Albums of the Decade so Far
2015-01-10 New Bands Special, featuring Fat White Family
2015-01-17 Noel Gallagher
2015-01-24 50 Albums You Must Hear in 2015
2015-01-31 50 MORE Albums You Must Hear in 2015
2015-02-07 Peace
2015-02-14 Richey Edwards
2015-02-21 Palma Violets
2015-02-28 Royal Blood
2015-03-07 Noel Gallagher
2015-03-14 Pete Doherty
2015-03-21 100 Greatest The Beatles songs
2015-03-28 Blur
2015-04-07 The Cribs
2015-04-14 Kurt Cobain and Courtney Love
2015-04-21 Mumford & Sons
2015-04-28 The Rolling Stones
2015-05-05 The Prodigy
2015-05-12 Brandon Flowers
2015-05-19 Catfish and the Bottlemen
2015-05-26 Muse
2015-06-02 The Vaccines
2015-06-09 Florence + the Machine
2015-06-16 Wolf Alice
2015-06-23 The Libertines
2015-06-30 Kanye West
2015-07-07 The Libertines
2015-07-14 Amy Winehouse
2015-07-21 Kendrick Lamar
2015-07-28 Slaves
2015-08-04 The Best of NME

2015 relaunch
2015-09-18 Rihanna
2015-09-25 Robert Pattinson
2015-10-02 Chris Moyles
2015-10-09 Taylor Swift
2015-10-16 Foals
2015-10-23 Sam Smith
2015-10-30 Nicholas Hoult
2015-11-06 Bloc Party
2015-11-13 Justin Bieber
2015-11-20 The Maccabees
2015-11-27 Daniel Radcliffe 
2015-12-04 Grimes 
2015-12-11 Lana Del Rey 
2015-12-18 NME's People Of The Year

2016

2016-01-15 David Bowie (tribute)
2016-01-22 The Last Shadow Puppets
2016-01-29 The 1975 
2016-02-05 James Bay
2016-02-12 Kanye West
2016-02-19 Coldplay
2016-02-26 Richard Ashcroft
2016-03-04 Jake Bugg
2016-03-11 Chvrches
2016-03-18 Nomad Hacks NME (special issue with Tej Adenuga, Connie Constance and Reese Cooper)
2016-03-25 Zayn Malik 
2016-04-01 Alex Turner 
2016-04-08 Years & Years 
2016-04-15 Idris Elba
2016-04-22 Biffy Clyro 
2016-04-29 Prince (tribute)
2016-05-06 Drake
2016-05-13 50 Albums You Must Hear Before You Die
2016-05-20 The Stone Roses new single review
2016-05-27 Kasabian
2016-06-03 Pete Doherty
2016-06-10 100 Things To Do This Summer
2016-06-17 Wiz Khalifa
2016-06-24 Glastonbury preview (with Adele cartoon)
2016-07-01 Glastonbury Festival review
2016-07-08 Bastille
2016-07-15 Bring Me the Horizon
2016-07-22 Anarchy In The UK
2016-07-29 Viola Beach 
2016-08-05 Blossoms
2016-08-12 Ricky Gervais
2016-08-19 Jamie T
2016-08-26 Lady Leshurr
2016-09-02 Major Lazer
2016-09-09 Kings Of Leon
2016-09-16 Britney Spears
2016-09-23 Zara Larsson
2016-09-30 M.I.A.
2016-10-07 Kano
2016-10-14 Slaves
2016-10-21 Lady Gaga
2016-10-28 Jamal Edwards
2016-11-04 Billie Joe Armstrong of Green Day
2016-11-11 Christine and the Queens
2016-11-18 Bruno Mars
2016-11-25 The 1975
2016-12-02 Deadmau5
2016-12-09 People Of The Year 2016
2016-12-16 Preview Of 2017

2017

2017-01-13 Wiley
2017-01-20 Run The Jewels
2017-01-27 T2 Trainspotting
2017-02-03 Rag'n'Bone Man
2017-02-10 Brit Marling
2017-02-17 Pet Shop Boys
2017-02-24 Bands 4 Refugees
2017-03-03 Ed Sheeran (cartoon)
2017-03-10 Chainsmokers
2017-03-17 Stormzy
2017-03-24 Tinie Tempah
2017-03-31 NME Festival Guide 2017
2017-04-07 Riz Ahmed
2017-04-14 Father John Misty
2017-04-21 Royal Blood
2017-04-28 Election 2017
2017-05-05 Kasabian
2017-05-12 Russell Brand
2017-05-19 Dua Lipa
2017-05-26 Liam Gallagher
2017-06-02 Jeremy Corbyn
2017-06-09 Katy Perry
2017-06-16 Lorde
2017-06-23 Alt-J
2017-06-30 Foo Fighters (Glastonbury Festival review)
2017-07-07 Mumford & Sons
2017-07-14 Dizzee Rascal
2017-07-21 Lana Del Rey
2017-07-28 The Songs Of The Summer
2017-08-04 Haim
2017-08-10 Wolf Alice
2017-08-18 London Grammar
2017-08-25 Bastille
2017-09-01 Josh Homme of Queens Of The Stone Age
2017-09-08 Bill Skarsgård as Pennywise
2017-09-15 The Killers
2017-09-22 Marilyn Manson
2017-09-29 Miley Cyrus
2017-10-06 Liam Gallagher
2017-10-13 Dave Grohl
2017-10-20 Matty Healy of The 1975 and Heather Baron-Gracie of Pale Waves
2017-10-27 Stranger Things 2
2017-11-03 Sam Smith
2017-11-10 Princess Nokia
2017-11-17 RZA
2017-11-24 Lorde
2017-12-01 Loyle Carner
2017-12-08 Mark Hamill as Luke Skywalker
2017-12-15 Gwen Stefani

2018

2018-01-19 New Music Special 100
2018-01-26 Craig David
2018-02-02 Camila Cabello
2018-02-09 Migos
2018-02-16 Liam Gallagher
2018-02-23 NME Awards Show 2018
2018-03-02 Shame
2018-03-09 Stefflon Don

On March 9, 2018, NME'' printed its final magazine. The weekly cover star was replaced with an online 'Big Read'.

2018-03-16 George Ezra
2018-03-23 Sunflower Bean
2018-03-30 The Vaccines
2018-04-06 Jared Leto on 30 Seconds to Mars
2018-04-13 Manic Street Preachers
2018-04-20 Courtney Barnett
2018-04-27 Chvrches
2018-05-04 Blossoms
2018-05-11 Arctic Monkeys
2018-05-18 Rae Sremmurd
2018-05-25 James Bay
2018-06-01 Slaves
2018-06-08 Lily Allen
2018-06-15 Calpurnia
2018-06-22 The Killers
2018-06-29 Gorillaz
2018-07-06 The Internet
2018-07-13 MØ
2018-07-20 The National
2018-07-27 Kasabian
2018-08-03 Miles Kane
2018-08-10 Deafheaven
2018-08-17 Troye Sivan
2018-08-24 Idles
2018-08-30 Lizzo
2018-09-07 Pale Waves
2018-09-14 Paul McCartney
2018-09-21 The 1975
2018-09-28 Christine and the Queens
2018-10-05 Halsey
2018-10-12 St. Vincent
2018-10-19 Tom Morello
2018-10-26 Robyn
2018-11-02 Ray BLK
2018-11-09 Jeff Goldblum
2018-11-16 Muse
2018-11-23 Mumford & Sons
2018-11-30 Years & Years
2018-12-07 Slowthai
2018-12-14 The 1975
2018-12-21 Wolf Alice
2018-12-28 Yoko Ono

2019

2019-01-04 Billie Eilish
2019-01-11 Maggie Rogers
2019-01-18 Bring Me the Horizon
2019-01-25 Sunflower Bean
2019-02-01 AJ Tracey
2019-02-08 Dream Wife
2019-02-15 Tommy Cash
2019-02-22 The Japanese House
2019-03-01 Twenty One Pilots
2019-03-08 Foals
2019-03-15 Danger Mouse and Karen O
2019-03-22 Dolly Parton
2019-03-29 Juice Wrld
2019-04-05 The Specials
2019-04-12 Black Honey
2019-04-19 Headie One
2019-04-26 Loyle Carner
2019-05-03 Mac DeMarco
2019-05-10 Chuck D
2019-05-17 Kacey Musgraves
2019-05-24 Amyl and the Sniffers
2019-05-31 Tierra Whack
2019-06-07 Mark Ronson
2019-06-14 Madonna
2019-06-21 Chemical Brothers
2019-06-28 The Killers
2019-07-05 The Cure
2019-07-12 Fat White Family
2019-07-19 Vampire Weekend
2019-07-26 The Good, the Bad & the Queen
2019-08-02 Clairo
2019-08-09 Slipknot
2019-08-16 Brockhampton
2019-08-23 The 1975
2019-08-30 Sheer Mag
2019-09-06 Lana Del Rey
2019-09-13 Iggy Pop
2019-09-20 Kano
2019-09-27 Desert Sessions
2019-10-04 Tove Lo
2019-10-11 Foals
2019-10-18 Yungblud
2019-10-25 Beabadoobee
2019-11-01 Haim
2019-11-08 Poppy
2019-11-15 Charli XCX
2019-11-21 Beck
2019-11-28 NME's Greatest Albums of The Decade
2019-12-06 Camila Cabello
2019-12-13 Billie Eilish
2019-12-20 Lewis Capaldi

2020

2020-01-03 Girl in Red
2020-01-10 The Big Moon
2020-01-17 Mura Masa
2020-01-24 The Game
2020-01-31 Kesha
2020-02-07 Green Day
2020-02-14 Tame Impala
2020-02-21 Ozzy Osbourne
2020-02-28 Liam Gallagher
2020-03-06 Porridge Radio
2020-03-13 Tory Lanez
2020-03-20 Rina Sawayama
2020-03-27 Blossoms
2020-04-03 Orville Peck
2020-04-10 Dua Lipa
2020-04-17 Laura Marling
2020-04-24 Jessie Reyez
2020-05-01 Glass Animals
2020-05-08 Hayley Williams
2020-05-15 Biffy Clyro
2020-05-22 The 1975
2020-05-29 The Strokes
2020-06-05 Fontaines D.C.
2020-06-12 Phoebe Bridgers
2020-06-19 Little Simz
2020-06-26 Khruangbin
2020-07-03 Megan Thee Stallion
2020-07-10 Haim
2020-07-17 Run The Jewels
2020-07-24 Arlo Parks
2020-07-31 Dominic Fike
2020-08-07 Burna Boy
2020-08-14 Angel Olsen
2020-08-21 The Killers
2020-08-28 Disclosure
2020-09-04 Declan McKenna
2020-09-11 Rico Nasty
2020-09-18 Idles
2020-09-25 Dizzee Rascal
2020-10-02 Boy Pablo
2020-10-09 Kelly Lee Owens
2020-10-16 Beabadoobee
2020-10-23 Machine Gun Kelly
2020-10-30 Bring Me the Horizon
2020-11-06 James Blake
2020-11-13 Gorillaz
2020-11-20 Pale Waves
2020-11-27 King Princess
2020-12-04 Yungblud
2020-12-11 Albums Of The Year 2020
2020-12-18 David Byrne

2021

2021-01-08 Pa Salieu
2021-01-15 Shame
2021-01-22 Lil Baby
2021-01-29 Celeste
2021-02-05 Foo Fighters
2021-02-12 Zara Larsson
2021-02-19 London Grammar
2021-02-26 Madison Beer
2021-03-05 Kings of Leon
2021-03-12 Wolf Alice
2021-03-19 Squid
2021-03-26 AJ Tracey
2021-04-02 St. Vincent
2021-04-09 Ray BLK
2021-04-16 Royal Blood
2021-04-23 Princess Nokia
2021-04-30 H.E.R.
2021-05-07 India Jordan
2021-05-14 Olivia Rodrigo
2021-05-21 Twenty One Pilots
2021-05-28 Easy Life
2021-06-04 Chvrches
2021-06-11 Aitch
2021-06-18 Slowthai
2021-06-25 Migos
2021-07-02 Jade Bird
2021-07-09 Sam Fender
2021-07-16 Clairo
2021-07-23 Vince Staples
2021-07-30 Bleachers
2021-08-06 Sigrid
2021-08-13 The Killers
2021-08-20 Self Esteem
2021-08-27 Lorde
2021-09-03 Little Simz
2021-09-10 Nova Twins
2021-09-17 Metallica
2021-09-24 Remi Wolf
2021-10-01 Finneas
2021-10-08 Snail Mail
2021-10-15 Coldplay
2021-10-22 Elton John
2021-10-29 Bad Boy Chiller Crew
2021-11-05 Swedish House Mafia
2021-11-12 Idles
2021-11-19 Summer Walker
2021-11-26 Halsey
2021-12-03 Willow
2021-12-10 Albums Of The Year 2021
2021-12-17 Mariah Carey

2022

2022-01-07 Bree Runway
2022-01-14 Yard Act
2022-01-21 Years & Years
2022-01-28 Alice Glass
2022-02-04 Red Hot Chili Peppers
2022-02-11 Foals
2022-02-18 Liam Gallagher
2022-02-25 FKA Twigs
2022-03-04 NME Awards Show 2022
2022-03-11 Rex Orange County
2022-03-18 Wet Leg
2022-03-25 Flo Milli
2022-04-01 Syd
2022-04-08 Blossoms
2022-04-15 Sharon Van Etten
2022-04-22 Fontaines DC
2022-04-29 Kehlani
2022-05-06 Arcade Fire
2022-05-13 Tomorrow X Together
2022-05-20 Pusha T
2022-05-27 Maneskin
2022-06-03 Yungblud
2022-06-10 Muse
2022-06-17 Sky Ferreira
2022-06-24 Billie Eilish
2022-07-01 Glastonbury Festival review
2022-07-08 Turnstile
2022-07-15 Denzel Curry
2022-07-22 Mabel
2022-07-29 Maggie Rogers
2022-08-05 Beabadoobee
2022-08-12 Pale Waves
2022-08-19 Kasabian
2022-08-26 Twice
2022-09-02 Bring Me the Horizon
2022-09-09 No cover until the 13th due to Queen Elizabeth II's death
2022-09-13 Taylor Hawkins Tribute Concert
2022-09-16 Rina Sawayama
2022-09-23 Phoenix
2022-09-30 Bjork
2022-10-07 Slipknot
2022-10-14 The 1975
2022-10-21 Arctic Monkeys
2022-10-28 Charli XCX
2022-11-04 Japanese Breakfast
2022-11-11 Confidence Man
2022-11-18 Nia Archives
2022-11-25 Muna
2022-12-02 Iggy Pop
2022-12-09 Albums Of The Year 2022
2022-12-16 SG Lewis
2022-12-23 Sam Ryder

2023

2023-01-06 FLO
2023-01-13 Shame
2023-01-20 Inhaler
2023-01-27 NewJeans
2023-02-03 PinkPantheress
2023-02-10 Paramore

References & footnotes

British music-related lists
Covers